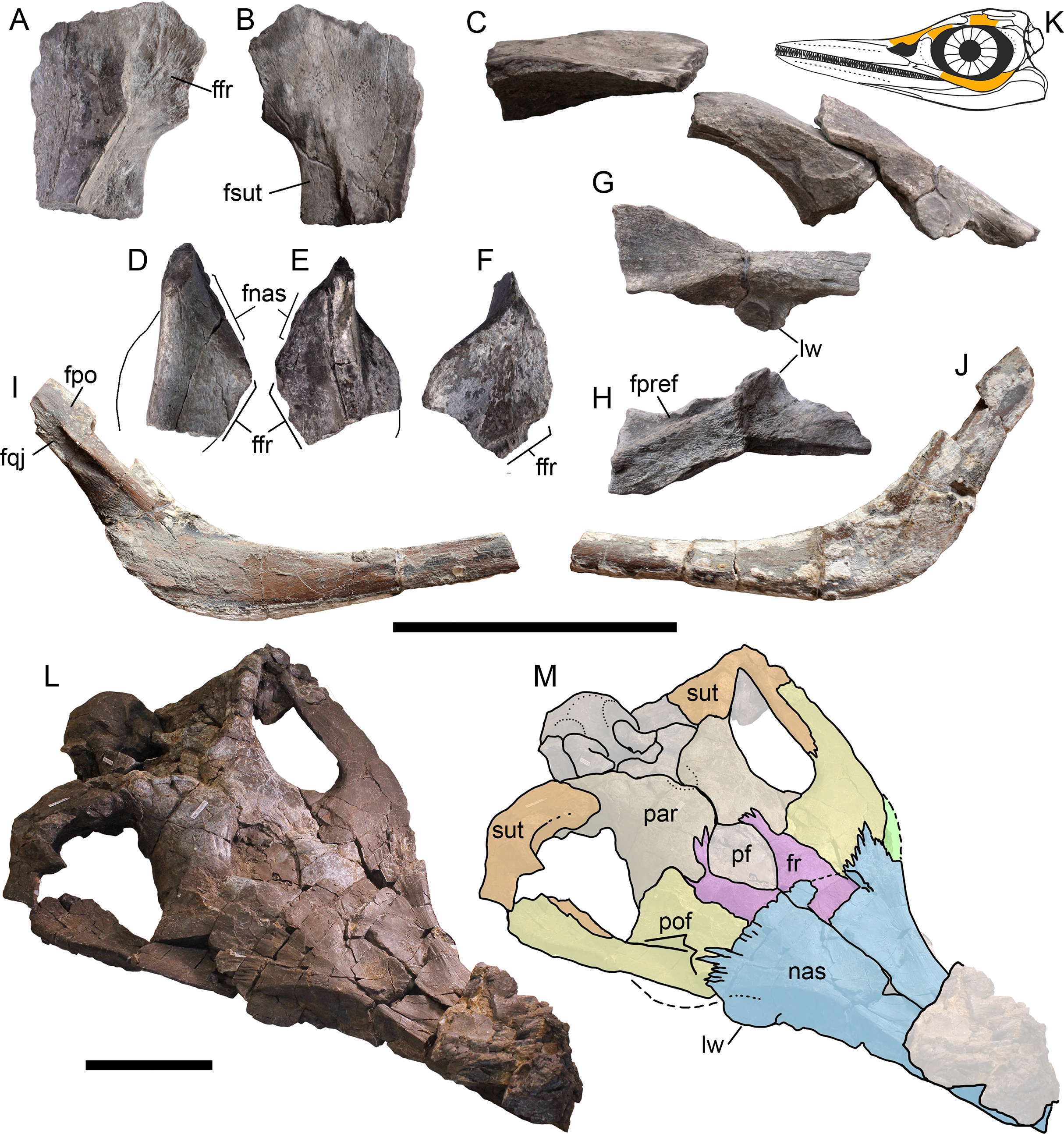
- Cranial elements of A. chrisorum

Scientific classification
- Kingdom: Animalia
- Phylum: Chordata
- Class: Reptilia
- Order: †Ichthyosauria
- Family: †Ophthalmosauridae
- Genus: †Arthropterygius; Maxwell, 2010

Type species
- †Arthropterygius chrisorum (Russel, 1993 [originally Ophthalmosaurus])

Other species
- †?A. hoybergeti (Druckenmiller et al., 2012); †?A. lundi (Roberts et al., 2014); †A. volgensis (Kasansky, 1903); †A. thalassonotus (Campos et al. 2019)

Synonyms
- ?Janusaurus Roberts et al., 2014; ?Keilhauia (Delsett et al., 2017); ?Palvennia Druckenmiller et al., 2012; Ophthalmosaurus chrisorum Russel, 1993; Ichthyosaurus volgensis Kasansky, 1903

= Arthropterygius =

Arthropterygius Temporal range: Kimmeridgian–？Berriasian ~155–140 Ma

Extinct genus of reptiles

Arthropterygius is a widespread genus of ophthalmosaurid ichthyosaur which existed in Canada, Norway, Russia, and Argentina from the late Jurassic period and possibly to the earliest Cretaceous.

== Description ==
Size comparison

Arthropterygius appears to have been a relatively large ichthyosaur, with all species measuring between 3–5 m (9.8–16.4 ft) long. The partially preserved specimen PMO 222.655 has been estimated at 3.8–4.3 metres (12–14 ft) based on comparisons to the contemporary ophthalmosaurid Undorosaurus. This specimen was probably mature or close to maturity at time of death, judging by the convex head of the humerus and the smooth texture of the humeral shaft.

=== Skull and axial skeleton ===
The skull of Arthropterygius has become well known due to the discovery of a well preserved skull from Svalbard. It is unusual among ichthyosaurs in having a very short, yet also robust rostrum for its skull length. As a result, the orbit appears very large (about 0.34× the skull length). The skull bears a very large pineal foramen, which is larger proportionately than that of any other ophthalmosaurid. This may potentially be an adaptation to the high latitude environment of Arthropterygius, but it is not yet well understood how the size of the pineal eye relates to latitude in ichthyosaurs. The presence of the foramen for the internal carotid artery (a major artery that supplies blood to the brain) on the posterior surface of the parabasisphenoid is a distinguishing trait of this genus. The teeth are relatively large, with robust, conical crowns, and are largely straight or slightly recurved.

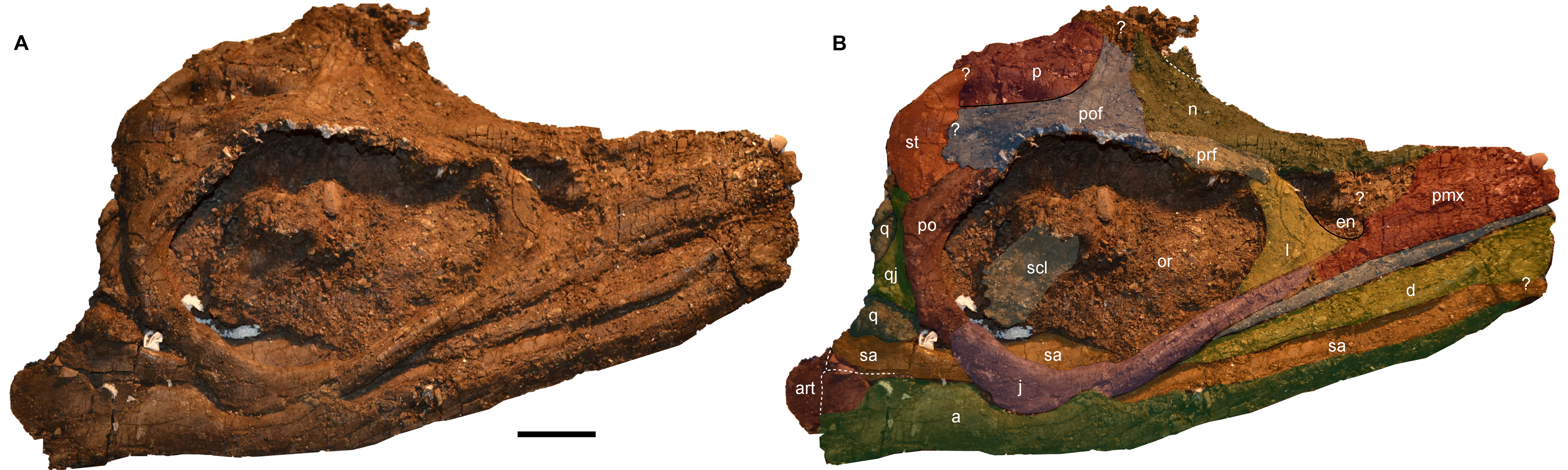
Skull of A. lundi

It is difficult to estimate the exact number of vertebral segments that were present in front of the sacrum; the preserved centra suggest that there are at least 43. This is more than the 42 in Athabascasaurus, the 41 in Nannopterygius, and the 37 in Platypterygius americanus, but less than the 46 in Platypterygius australis and the 50 or more in Undorosaurus, Aegirosaurus, and Platypterygius platydactylus. The posterior dorsal vertebrae are wider and taller than those near the front, and their front and rear faces are rounded. The first few caudal vertebrae are the proportionally tallest and widest of all the vertebrae, but the vertebrae quickly become shorter vertically prior to the bend in the tail that supported the tail fluke.

Each neural spine is about the same length as the underlying centrum, which is similar to Undorosaurus but not Ophthalmosaurus (in which they are proportionally longer in the posterior cervical vertebrae). Similar to Gengasaurus, the first few neural spines are taller than the corresponding centra, but then decrease in height gradually. The tops of the neural spines, which are the thinnest parts of the bones, are straight, instead of being notched like Undorosaurus or Platypterygius australis. The ribs are shaped like a figure eight in cross section near their top ends, but this is less obvious closer to the bottom; such a morphology is typical among ophthalmosaurids, except for Acamptonectes and Mollesaurus. The dorsal ribs are around 75–81 cm (30–32 in) long, while the first few caudal ribs are only 2–5 cm (0.79–1.97 in) long.

=== Forelimb and pectoral girdle ===
In Arthropterygius, the scapula has a relatively straight blade that was broadened at its front end into a fan-like acromion process. This process is less prominent than that of Acamptonectes and Sveltonectes, instead being more similar to that of Undorosaurus, Platypterygius hercynicus, and Sisteronia. The scapula formed more of the glenoid than the coracoid; like Sveltonectes but unlike Undorosaurus, the glenoid does not extend onto the bottom face of the scapula. The de facto blade of the scapula was widest near the middle, and angled slightly downwards; like Acamptonectes but unlike all other ophthalmosaurids, the blade has a relatively uniform thickness along its entire length.

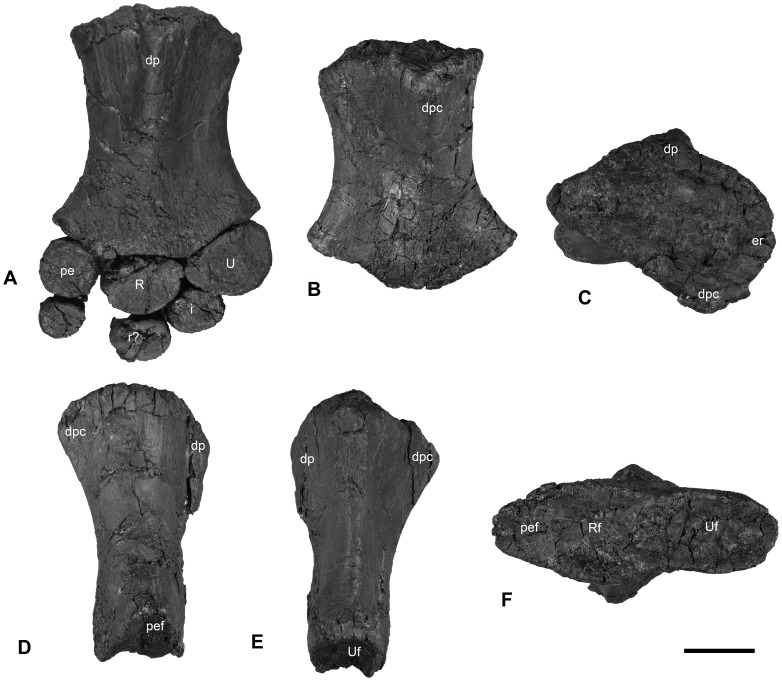
Humerus of A. lundi

The clavicle, which is not fused to other elements in the pectoral girdle, bears a thickened process on its frontal bottom edge which points towards the midline of the torso. This process is relatively short, square-shaped from the front, and bordered by a rim on its back edge. In most other ophthalmosaurids, this same process is more finger-like, although some specimens of Ophthalmosaurus have similar processes. The back part of the clavicle gradually narrows into a curved point, as in Ophthalmosaurus and Baptanodon.

The coracoid is a kidney-shaped bone that is about as long as it is wide, compared to Undorosaurus, Nannopterygius, and Sveltonectes, where it is not as wide proportionally. Like Ophthalmosaurus, the coracoid bears a prominent notch on its front edge; it also bears a ridge on the frontal part of its midline, like Ophthalmosaurus and Acamptonectes, but unlike Caypullisaurus and Platypterygius australis. Its articular facets with the scapula and glenoid are clearly separate, as in Sveltonectes but not Acamptonectes. The former is only about 45% of the latter in length; this figure is 50% in Undorosaurus.

There are two prominent processes on the humerus. The longer, less prominent, and more ridge-like of these is the dorsal process. This process is remarkably short compared to other ophthalmosaurids, being less than half of the length of the humeral shaft, a condition also seen in Undorosaurus and Aegirosaurus; in Ophthalmosaurus, Brachypterygius, Nannopterygius, and Undorosaurus, the process reaches the midpoint of the humerus, while it is even longer in Platypterygius americanus, Platypterygius australis, and Platypterygius hercynicus. The other process is the deltopectoral crest, which is about half of the shaft length in Ophthalmosaurus, and is almost as long as the entire shaft in Sisteronia, Acamptonectes, and Platypterygius americanus.

At the midpoint of the humeral shaft, the bone is mildly constricted, being approximately 20% narrower than the maximum width. The bottom end of the humerus is larger than the top end; it bears three articular facets, with one for the preaxial accessory element (the smallest of the three), one for the radius (the tallest of the three), and one for the ulna (which forms an angle of 120° with the radial facet). Sveltonectes, Nannopterygius, Platypterygius hauthali, and Platypterygius platydactylus all only have two; Maiaspondylus, Aegirosaurus, Brachypterygius, and Platypterygius americanus also have three, but the second facet articulates with a different bone; Undorosaurus has two on the left humerus and three on the right; and Platypterygius australis and Platypterygius hercynicus have up to four facets.

=== Hindlimb and pelvic girdle ===
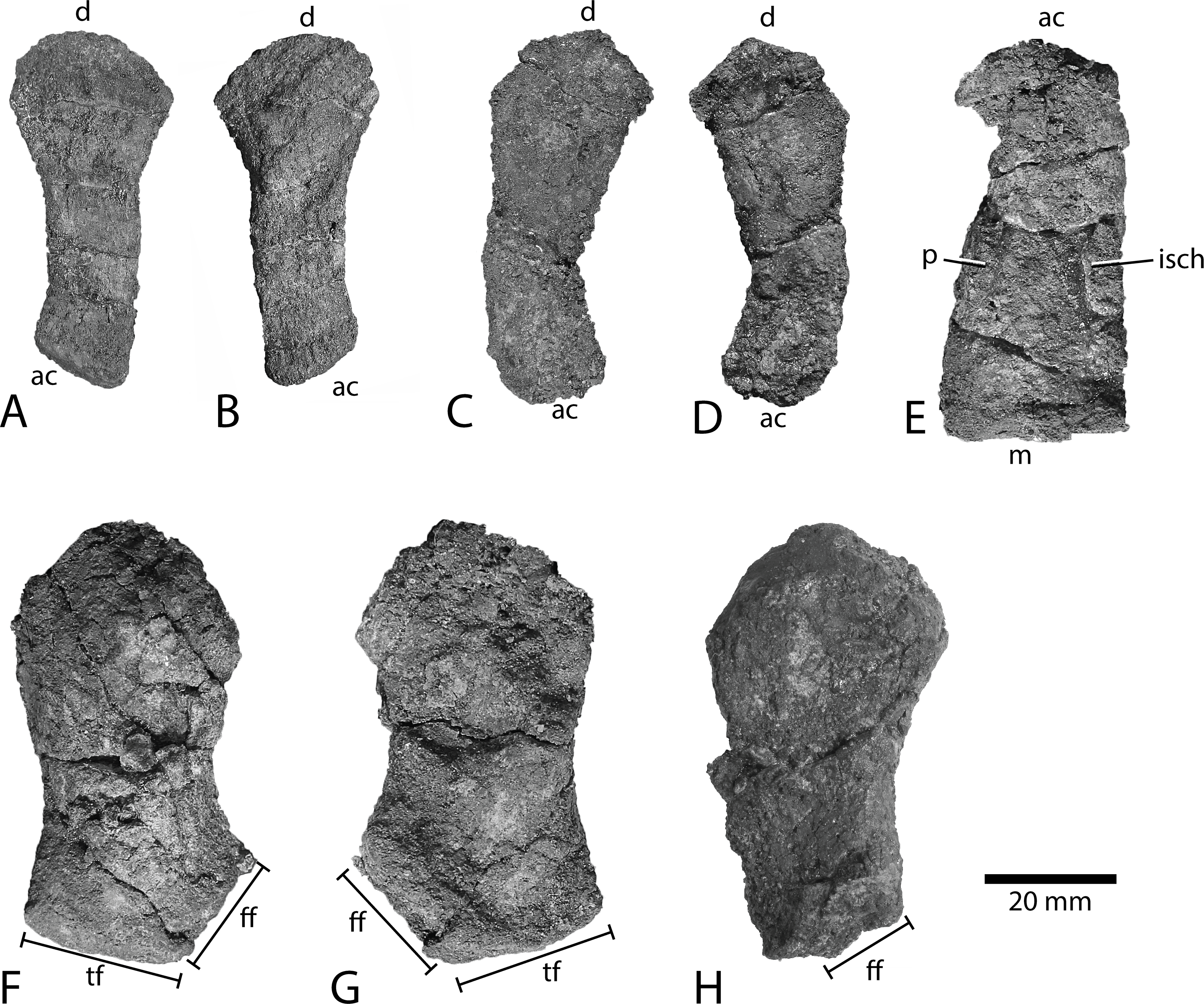
Ilium (A-D), ischiopubis (E), and femur (F-H) of Arthropterygius sp.

The ilium of Arthropterygius is rather short compared to that of other ophthalmosaurids; Aegirosaurus is the only other ophthalmosaurid that possibly approaches Arthropterygius in this respect. The side of the ilium directed towards the back of the body is concave, like Ophthalmosaurus and Athabascasaurus, with the curve being more pronounced in the latter two. The acetabulum, on the lower end of the ilium, is thickened relative to the rest of the bone, and does not bear any distinct articular facets. Autapomorphically, the top end of the ilium is 1.5 times the width of the acetabular end.

The ischium and the pubis are fused together into a single, continuous, solid trapezoid-shaped element known as the ischiopubis, with the wider edge (1.4 times the width of the other end, which is shorter proportionally than that of Aegirosaurus, Ophthalmosaurus, and Athabascasaurus) being at the midline of the body. This complete fusion is also seen in Sveltonectes, Athabascasaurus, Aegirosaurus, Caypullisaurus, and possibly Platypterygius australis; meanwhile, Ophthalmosaurus, Undorosaurus, and Nannopterygius retain a small hole in the ischiopubis. The probable portion of the ischiopubis that represents the pubis is thicker than the rest of the bone. Also uniquely among ophthalmosaurids, this fused element is shorter than the femur.

Both ends of the femur of Arthropterygius are approximately the same width, with the middle of the femoral shaft being slightly narrower. The top end was slightly thicker than the rest of the bone along its front rim. Unlike Ophthalmosaurus, the femoral dorsal and ventral processes were rather reduced. At the bottom end, there are two facets, one for the tibia and one for the fibula; this is typical of ophthalmosaurids, but Platypterygius hercynicus, Platypterygius americanus, Platypterygius australis, and Nannopterygius all have three. Both facets in Arthropterygius were roughly the same length, and the fibular facet was directed slightly to the back, forming an angle of 120° with the tibial facet.

== Discovery and classification ==
The genus was first named in 2010 by Erin E. Maxwell as the generic replacement name for Ophthalmosaurus chrisorum, which was named in 1993 from fossils found on Melville Island in the Northwest Territories. Its fossils are the most complete of any ichthyosaur in the Canadian Arctic. A. chrisorum has several features that separate it from the genus Ophthalmosaurus, including a highly angled articulation between the radius and ulna and the humerus. Maxwell 2010 found it to be the sister taxon of Caypullisaurus, an ophthalmosaurid from Argentina. However, many recent cladistic analyses found it to be the basalmost member of the Ophthalmosauridae.

In 2012, a skull and forefin discovered of an ophthalmosaurid ichthyosaur discovered in the Neuquén Basin of Argentina were described. This specimen was notable for presenting unusual braincase morphology including the opening for the internal carotid artery on the posterior surface of the parabasisphenoid, which is a diagnostic trait of Arthropterygius, which was at the time only known from Canada. This specimen was initially referred to Arthropterygius sp., massively expanding the known range of the genus. This presents strong evidence that some Jurassic marine reptiles had near cosmopolitan distributions, much like many marine mammals today. A paper published by Campos et al. in 2019 further describes this specimen, and designates it as the holotype of a new species, A. thalassonotus.

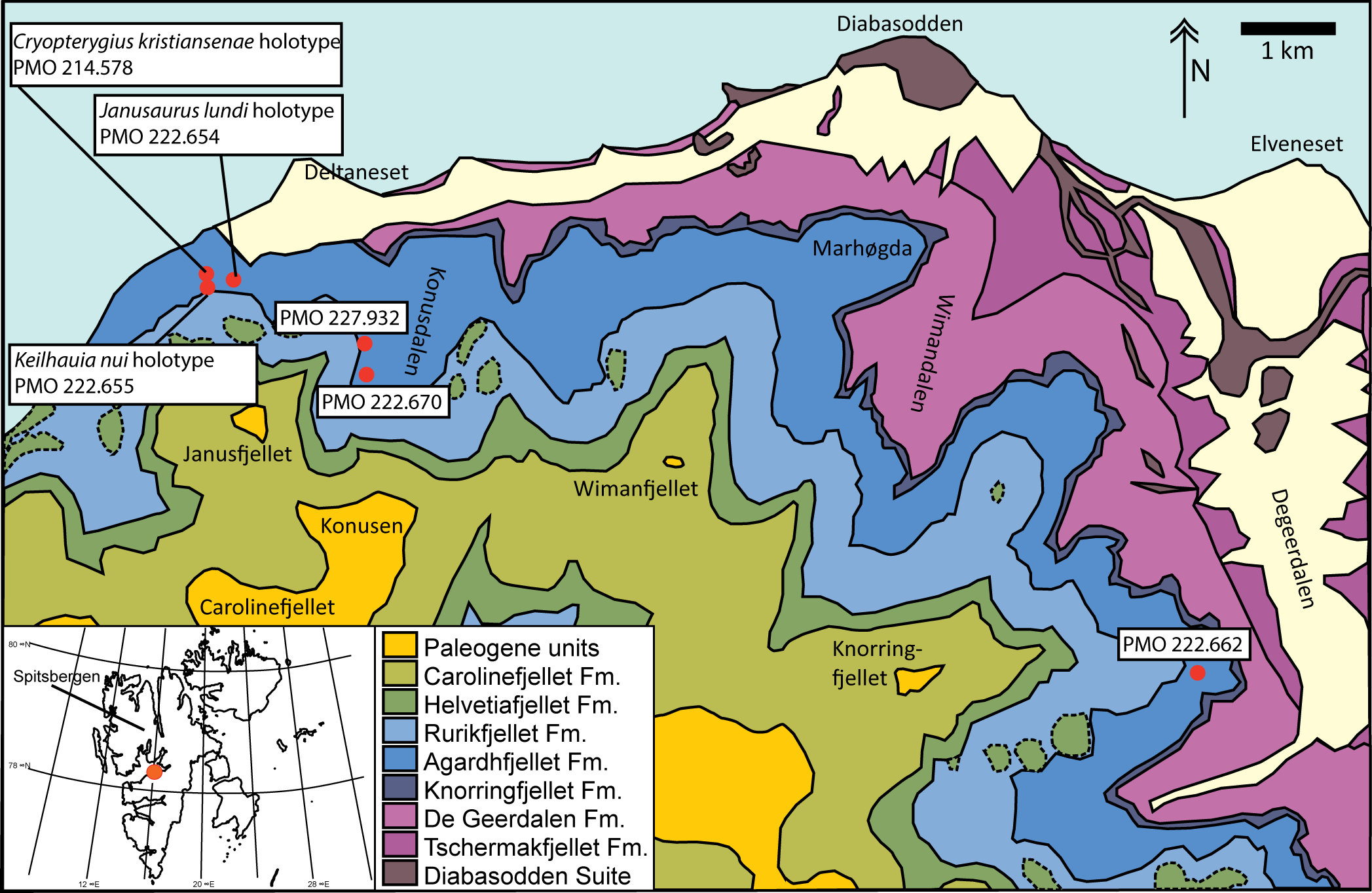
Map showing location of ichthyosaur finds on the island of Spitsbergen

Eight seasons of excavations led by the Spitsbergen Mesozoic Research Group on the island of Spitsbergen, Svalbard, Norway from 2004 to 2012 recovered 29 ichthyosaur specimens from outcrops of the Slottsmøya Member lagerstätte, which belongs to the greater Agardhfjellet Formation. These outcrops likely date to the Volgian (which roughly corresponds to the Tithonian-early Berriasian) based on ammonite biostratigraphy. From these, numerous new genera and species of ichthyosaur were described including Cryopterygius kristiansenae (later recognized to be synonymous with Undorosaurus gorodischensis), Palvennia hoybergeti (named for PalVenn, the Friends of the Palaeontological Museum in Oslo, whose expedition led to the discovery of the type specimen), and Janusaurus lundi (named for the mountain Janusfjellet, where the specimen was found). Janusaurus and Palvennia were both named off of less extensive material the Cryopterygius, but both were recognizably distinct to that genus and were deemed to be distinct genera. An additional ichthyosaur specimen was prepared at the University of Oslo and subsequently described in 2016: PMO 222.655, the holotype of Keilhauia nui, discovered from the Berriasian portions of the Slottsmøya Member in 2010. This specimen comprises an articulated partial skeleton, which was preserved lying on its left side, including part of the snout, the dorsal and anterior caudal vertebrae, the right forelimb and pectoral girdle, the majority of the pubic girdle, and both of the femora. The genus name Keilhauia honours the Norwegian geologist Baltazar Mathias Keilhau, who conducted an expedition to Spitsbergen in 1827. Meanwhile, the species name nui is derived from the acronym of the environmental organization Natur og Ungdom, the fiftieth anniversary of which occurred in 2017.

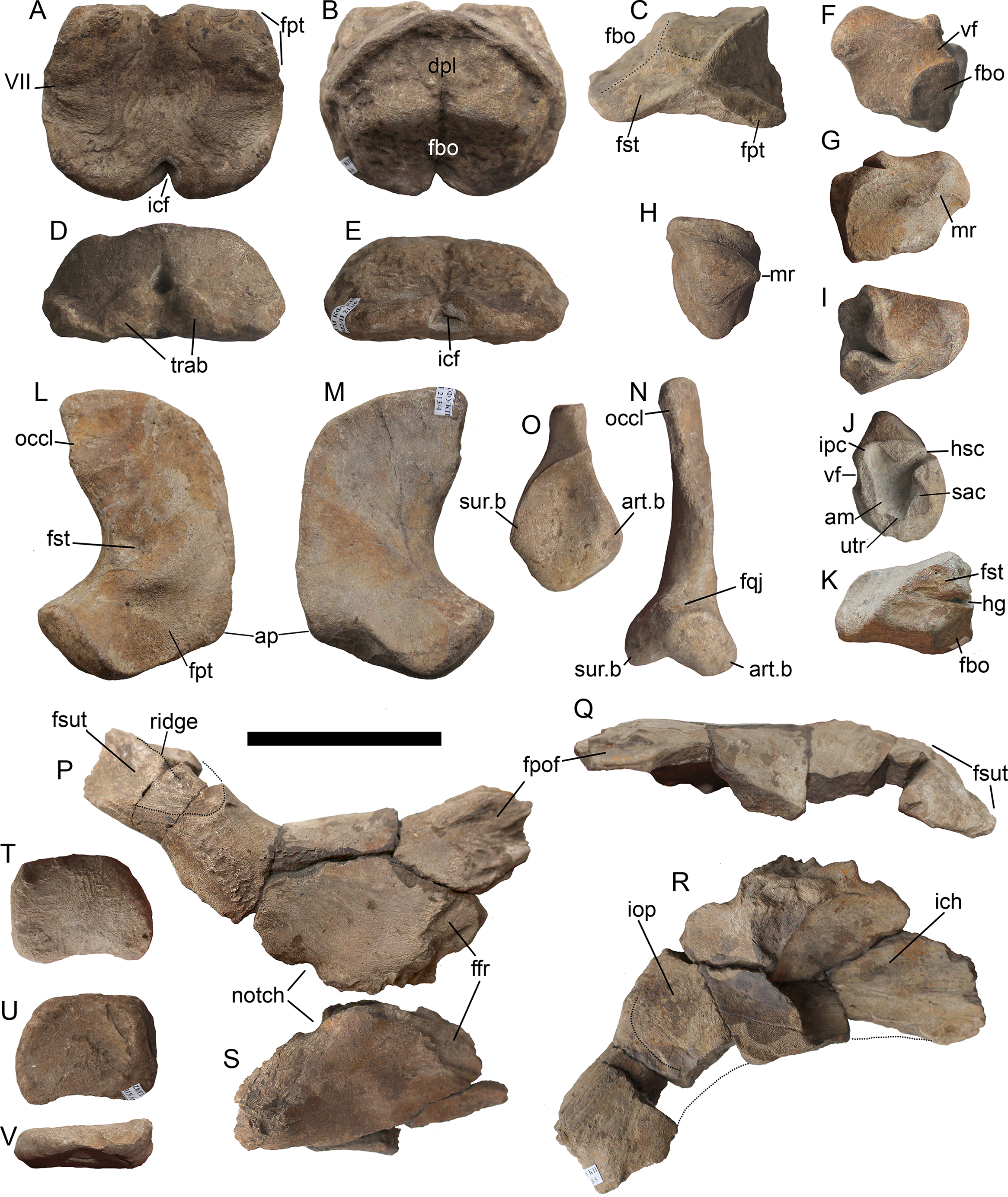
Cranial elements of A. volgensis

An extensive revision of Arthropterygius conducted by Zverkov and Prilepskaya in 2019 revealed Janusaurus and Palvennia to be junior synonyms of that genus. They were reassigned as the species A. lundi and A. hoybergeti respectively. Additionally, they determined that the holotype and only known specimen of Keilhauia is referrable to Arthropterygius as well. However, the poor preservation of the material made it difficult to identify it at the species level, and thus they referred the specimen simply to A. sp. cf. chrisorum and designated the name Keilhauia nui as a nomen dubium. They also found that the specimen PMO 222.669, which was referred to Palvennia by Delsett et al. (2018), shares all identifying features with A. chrisorum and that there are no sufficient differences between them to warrant it belonging to A. hoybergeti. This means that there were at least three species of Arthropterygius present in the Slottsmøya Member, and significantly expands the geographic range of the species A. chrisorum specifically. The recognition that these taxa are referable to Arthropterygius also makes this now one of the best understood ichthyosaurs of the Late Jurassic. They also recognize the previously dubious taxon "Ichthyosaurus" volgensis from Syzran in Russia as belonging to a newly recognized species of Arthropterygius, A. volgensis. This provides further support for the previously established idea that there was significant faunal interchange between the Volga region and Svalbard during the Volgian.

While Zverkov and some others treat Janusaurus, Keilhauia and Palvennia within Arthropterygius, a study on the Jurassic Ichthyosaurs performed by Delsett et al. suggests the synonymy is not supported by the presence evidence.

=== Phylogeny ===
The following cladogram shows a possible phylogenetic position of Arthropterygius in Ophthalmosauridae according to the analysis performed by Zverkov and Jacobs (2020).

- Ophthalmosauria
  - - Ophthalmosaurinae
      - - - - Acamptonectes densus
            - - Mollesaurus periallus
              - - Ophthalmosaurus natans
                - Ophthalmosaurus icenicus
      - - - Gengasaurus nicosiai
          - - - Nannopterygius yasykovi
              - - Nannopterygius enthekiodon
                - Nannopterygius saveljeviensis
                - Nannopterygius borealis
            - - - Arthropterygius volgensis
                - - Arthropterygius lundi
                  - Arthropterygius thalassonotus
                  - - Arthropterygius hoybergeti
                    - Arthropterygius chrisorum
    - Platypterygiinae
      - - Brachypterygius extremus
        - Aegirosaurus leptospondylus
        - - Muiscasaurus catheti
          - - Leninia stellans
            - - Sveltonectes insolitus
              - - Athabascasaurus bitumineus
                - - Platypterygius americanus
                  - - - Acuetzpalin carranzai
                      - Platypterygius sachicarum
                      - Caypullisaurus bonapartei
                    - - - - Grendelius mordax
                          - Grendelius alekseevi
                          - Grendelius pseudoscythicus
                          - Grendelius zhuravlevi
                        - - - - Undorosaurus kielanae
                              - - Undorosaurus nessovi
                                - Undorosaurus gorodischensis
                      - - Platypterygius australis
                        - - Plutoniosaurus bedengensis
                          - Simbirskiasaurus birjukovi
                          - Platypterygius hercynicus
                          - Sisteronia seeleyi
                          - Platypterygius platydactylus
                          - Maiaspondylus lindoei

== Paleoecology ==
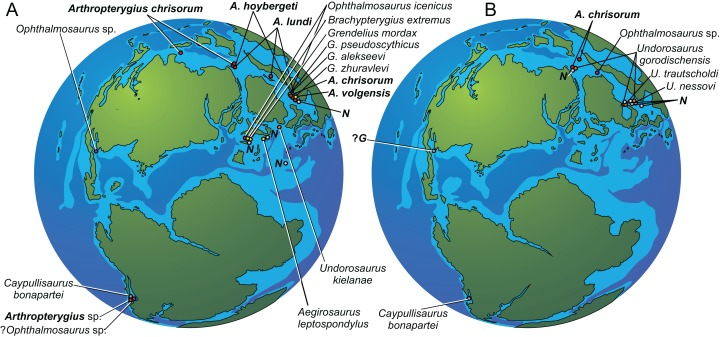
Biogeography of ophthalmosaurid ichthyosaurs of the (A) Kimmeridgian-Middle Volgian and (B) Middle-Late Volgian, including Arthropterygius

Arthropterygius appears to have been a particularly wide-ranging genus, with fossils known from several high latitude localities across the Northern Hemisphere, as well as an isolated specimen from Argentina.

The Slottsmøya Member of the Agardhfjellet Formation, from which fossils of A. chrisorum, A. lundi, and A. hoybergeti have been recovered, provides perhaps the best glimpse into the ecosystems and habitats this genus was a part of. It consists of a mix of shales and siltstones and was deposited in a shallow water methane seep environment, near a patch of deeper marine sediment. The seafloor, which was located about 150 metres (490 ft) below the surface, seems to have been relatively dysoxic, or oxygen-poor, although it was periodically oxygenated by clastic sediments. Despite this, near the top of the member, various diverse assemblages of invertebrates associated with cold seeps have been discovered; these include ammonites, lingulate brachiopods, bivalves, rhynchonellate brachiopods, tubeworms, belemnoids, tusk shells, sponges, crinoids, sea urchins, brittle stars, starfish, crustaceans, and gastropods, numbering 54 taxa in total. Outside of the cold seeps, many of these invertebrates were also present in abundance. Though direct evidence from Slottsmøya is currently lacking, the high latitude of this site and relatively cool global climate of the Tithonian mean that sea ice was likely present at least in the winter.

In addition to Arthropterygius, the Slottsmøya Member presents a diverse assemblage of other marine reptiles, including the ichthyosaurs Undorosaurus gorodischensis, Nannopterygius borealis, and a partial skull attributed to Brachypterygius sp.. Additionally, 21 plesiosaurian specimens are also known from the site, including two belonging to the large pliosaurid Pliosaurus funkei, which would have been the apex predator of the ecosystem, three to Colymbosaurus svalbardensis, one to Djupedalia engeri, one to Ophthalmothule cryostea, and one each to Spitrasaurus wensaasi and S. larseni. Many of these specimens are preserved in three dimensions and partially in articulation; this is correlated with high abundance of organic elements in the sediments they were buried in, as well as a lack of invertebrates locally.

Material belonging to four species of Arthropterygius, A. chrisorum, A. volgensis, A. lundi, and A. hoybergeti, has been reported from the Volga region of Russia, which gives the Volgian stage its name. Though very little is known or published about the fossils of these localities, fossils of a number of marine animals have been recovered, including species of the ichthyosaurs Nannopterygius and Undorosaurus. The presence of these taxa indicates that there was significant faunal exchange across the seas of Northern Europe during this time period. In addition to these three genera, fossils of the ichthyosaur Grendelius, the pliosaur Pliosaurus rossicus, and indeterminate remains belonging to a metriorhynchid, as well as a high diversity of ammonites including the large-bodied taxon Titanites, are also known from the Volgian-aged sediments of this region.

A. thalassonotus hails from the Vaca Muerta Formation of the Neuquén Basin in Patagonia, Argentina. This is arguably one of the best marine reptile-bearing fossil sites of the Southern Hemisphere, and has revealed a great number of specimens of Late Jurassic marine reptiles. In addition to Arthropterygius, the ichthyosaurs Caypullisaurus bonapartei and Ophthalmosaurus sp. as well as two species of the genus Pliosaurus, P. patagonicus and P. almanzaensis, and a variety of marine turtles are known from the formation. It also features a uniquely diverse array of metriorhynchids, with species belonging to the genera Dakosaurus, Cricosaurus, Purranisaurus, and Geosaurus all having been reported. The extent to which the fauna reported from the Vaca Muerta Formation resembles that known from sites in the Northern Hemisphere, such as the Kimmeridge Clay, suggests that many marine reptile genera may have had near cosmopolitan distributions in the Late Jurassic.

== See also ==
- List of ichthyosaurs
- Timeline of ichthyosaur research
