= Agardhfjellet Formation =

Geological formation in Svalbard, Norway

- Stratigraphic range: Oxfordian-Berriasian; ~157.9–141 Ma
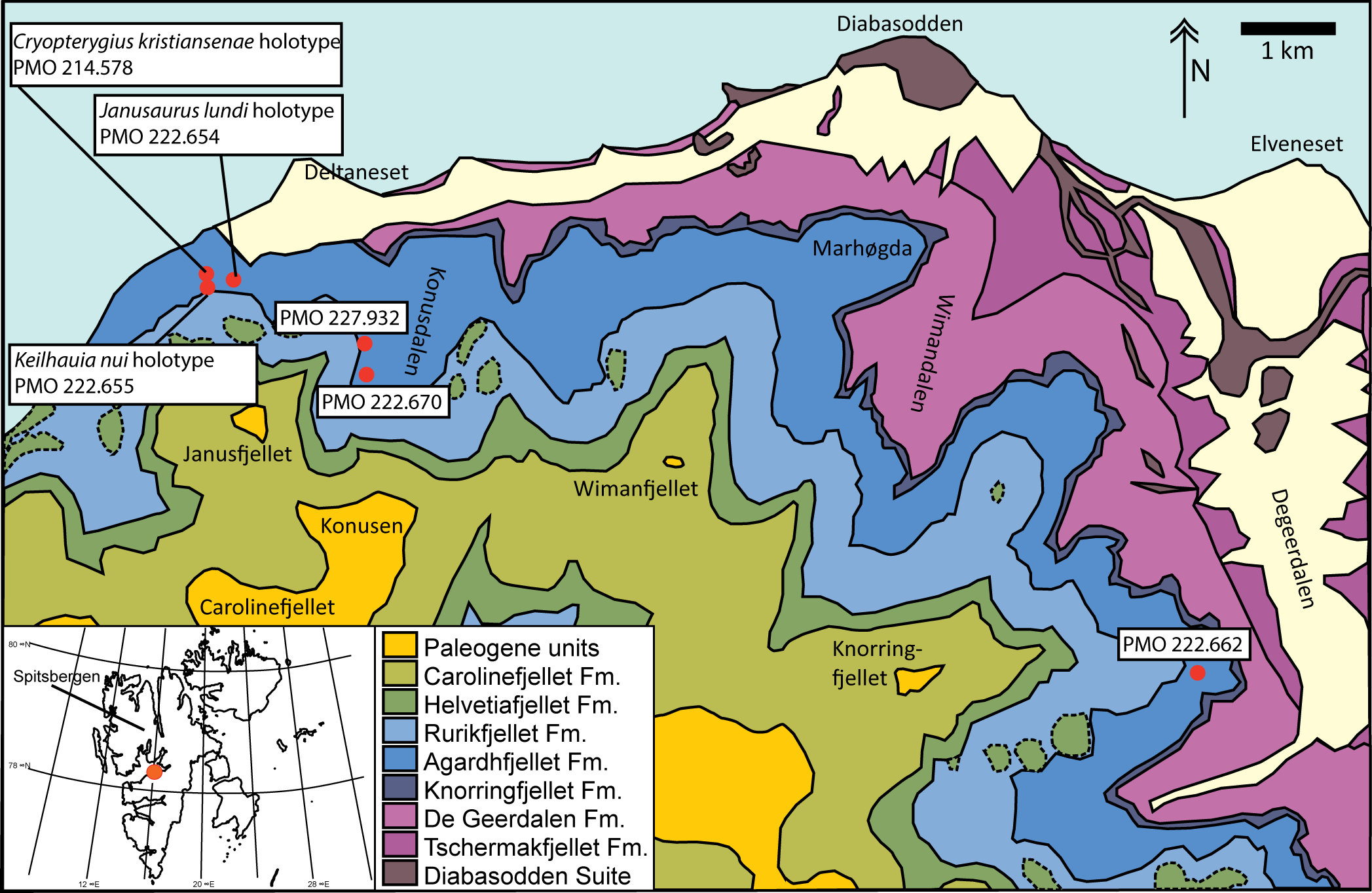
- Geologic map of central Svalbard with the formation in dark blue
- Type: Formation
- Unit of: Adventdalen Group
- Sub-units: Oppdalsåta & Slottsmøya Members
- Underlies: Rurikfjellet Formation
- Overlies: Knorringfjellet Formation

Lithology
- Primary: Mudstone
- Other: Dolomite

Location
- Coordinates: 78.3°N 15.8°E
- Approximate paleocoordinates: 69.6°N 16.3°E
- Region: Svalbard
- Country: Norway
- Extent: Central Spitsbergen Basin

The Agardhfjellet Formation is a geologic formation in Svalbard, Norway. It preserves fossils dating back to the Oxfordian to Berriasian stages, spanning the Late Jurassic-Early Cretaceous boundary. The formation contains the Slottsmøya Member, a highly fossiliferous unit (Lagerstätte) where many ichthyosaur and plesiosaur fossils have been found, as well as abundant and well preserved fossils of invertebrates.

== Description ==
The formation overlies the Knorringfjellet Formation and is overlain by the Rurikfjellet Formation. The formation comprises the lower Oppdalsåta and upper Slottsmøya Members. The Slottsmøya Member, which averages 55 to 60 metres (180 to 197 ft) in thickness in the study area, consists of dark-grey to black silty mudstone, often weathering to paper shale, and discontinuous silty beds with local occurrences of red to yellowish sideritic concretions as well as siderite and dolomite interbeds. It consists of a mix of shales and siltstones which were deposited in a shallow marine environment, near a patch of deeper marine sediment. The seafloor, which was located about 150 metres (490 ft) below the surface, seems to have been relatively dysoxic, or oxygen-poor, although the diversity of the benthic fauna suggest that these environments were likely not truly anoxic and that oxygen-depletion may have been a seasonal phenomenon. Although direct evidence from Slottsmøya is currently lacking, the high latitude of this site and relatively cool global climate of the Tithonian suggest that some sea ice may have been present at least in the winter.

These sites represent shallow-water methane seeps which were spread over a relatively large geographic area, and like modern day seeps, they supported high biodiversity. Near the top of the member, various assemblages of invertebrates have been discovered; these include ammonites, bivalves, lingulate brachiopods, rhynchonellate brachiopods, tubeworms, belemnoids, tusk shells, sponges, crinoids, sea urchins, brittle stars, starfish, crustaceans, and gastropods, numbering 54 taxa in total. The most common and abundant of these taxa were bivalves and brachiopods, each of which make up 27.8% of the known seep fauna. Several chemosymbiotic species are known, such as the bivalve Nucinella. Outside of the cold seeps, several non-seep-restricted invertebrates were also present in abundance. In addition to the invertebrates, the Slottsmøya Member has also revealed a diverse assemblage of marine reptiles, including several taxa of ichthyosaurs and plesiosaurs. Many of these specimens are relatively complete and in articulation, which is rare among Jurassic marine fossil sites. It thus provides a unique and detailed glimpse into the boreal seas of the Late Jurassic. As it spans the Jurassic-Cretaceous boundary, it is also important to understanding how marine ecosystems changed going into the Cretaceous.

== Paleobiota ==
Color key: Taxon / Reclassified taxon / Taxon falsely reported as present / Dubious taxon or junior synonym / Ichnotaxon / Ootaxon / Morphotaxon	Notes; Uncertain or tentative taxa are in small text; ~~crossed out~~ taxa are discredited.

The formation, especially the Slottsmøya Member, has provided an abundance of marine fossils dating to the Late Jurassic-Early Cretaceous.

The timeline below follows stratigraphic data provided in Delsett et al. 2018 and Roberts et al. 2020.

=== Vertebrates ===
==== Bony fish ====
Bony fish from the Agardhfjellet Formation
Genus	Species	Location	Member	Material	Notes	Images
Leptolepis	L. nathorsti		Oppdalssåta & Lardyfjellet Members			

==== Plesiosaurs ====
Plesiosaurs from the Agardhfjellet Formation
Genus	Species	Location	Member	Material	Notes	Images
Tricleidus	T. svalbardensis		Slottsmøya Member		Reassigned to the genus Colymbosaurus after further analysis	
Colymbosaurus	C. svalbardensis		Slottsmøya Member		A colymbosaurine cryptoclidid, also known from the Kimmeridge Clay	Specimen from an unknown location
Djupedalia	D. engeri		Slottsmøya Member		A cryptoclidid plesiosaur	
Ophthalmothule	O. cryostea		Slottsmøya Member	Extensive skeletal material including a complete cranium	A cryptoclidid plesisosaur which has unusually large orbits, indicating possible deep-diving and/or nocturnal behaviors.	
Spitrasaurus	S. wensaasi		Slottsmøya Member		A cryptoclidid plesiosaur related to Ophthalmothule	
Spitrasaurus	S. larseni		Slottsmøya Member		A cryptoclidid plesiosaur related to Ophthalmothule	
Pliosaurus	P. funkei		Slottsmøya Member	Known from two partial skeletons	A very large thalassophonean pliosaurid which was informally known as "Predator X" prior to being named. P. funkei is among the largest of all pliosaurs and is notable for having unusually large flippers in comparison to its body size. This genus is also known from Kimmeridge Clay.	

==== Ichthyosaurs ====
Ichthyosaurs from the Agardhfjellet Formation
Genus	Species	Location	Member	Material	Notes	Images
Cryopterygius	C. kristiansenae		Slottsmøya Member		Junior synonym of Undorosaurus gorodischensis	
Undorosaurus	U. gorodischensis		Slottsmøya Member	A single, largely complete specimen	A large platypterygiine ichthyosaur, also known from the Russian Volga.	
Janusaurus	J. lundi		Slottsmøya Member		Junior synonym of Arthropterygius lundi	
Palvennia	P. hoybergeti		Slottsmøya Member		Junior synonym of A. hoybergeti	
Keilhauia	K. nui		Slottsmøya Member		A nomen dubium referred to A. sp. cf. chrisorum	
Arthropterygius	A. lundi		Slottsmøya Member	Several specimens of varying ages, previously referred to several other genera	A widespread genus of ophthalmosaurid ichthyosaur, also known from Canada, Russia, and Argentina. Is present both before and directly after the Jurassic-Cretaceous Boundary.	
Arthropterygius	A. hoybergeti		Slottsmøya Member	Several specimens of varying ages, previously referred to several other genera	A widespread genus of ophthalmosaurid ichthyosaur, also known from Canada, Russia, and Argentina. Is present both before and directly after the Jurassic-Cretaceous Boundary.	
Arthropterygius	A. chrisorum		Slottsmøya Member	Several specimens of varying ages, previously referred to several other genera	A widespread genus of ophthalmosaurid ichthyosaur, also known from Canada, Russia, and Argentina. Is present both before and directly after the Jurassic-Cretaceous Boundary.	
Nannopterygius	N. borealis		Slottsmøya Member		An ophthalmosaurid ichthyosaur present in early Cretaceous strata. This genus is also known from the Kimmeridge Clay and from fossil sites in the Volga.	Specimen from Kimmeridge Bay, England
Brachypterygius	B. sp.		Slottsmøya Member	Partial skull	Referred to Brachypterygius by Angst et al. (2010)	

=== Invertebrates ===
An unnamed galatheid squat lobster is known from a single, poorly preserved fragment.

==== Cephalopods ====
Large belemnoid arm hooks are known.

Cephalopods from the Agardhfjellet Formation
Genus	Species	Location	Member	Material	Notes	Images
Craspedites	C. okensis		Slottsmøya Member			Specimen from an unknown location
Craspedites	C. originalis		Slottsmøya Member			Specimen from an unknown location
Borealites	B. rossicus		Slottsmøya Member			
Borealites	B. sp.		Slottsmøya Member			
Hectoroceras	H. kochi		Slottsmøya Member			
Hectoroceras	H. sp.		Slottsmøya Member			
Kachpurites	K. sp.		Slottsmøya Member			
Surites	S. spasskensis		Slottsmøya Member			
Surites	S. spasskensoides		Slottsmøya Member			
Surites	S. tzikwinianus		Slottsmøya Member			
Surites	S. mesezhnikovi		Slottsmøya Member			
Tollia	T. tolli		Slottsmøya Member			

==== Echinoderms ====
Echinoderms from the Agardhfjellet Formation
Genus	Species	Location	Member	Material	Notes	Images
Chariocrinus	C. sp.		Slottsmøya Member		A form of isocrinid crinoid	Modern isocrinid crinoid, Neocrinus decorus, from Saint Vincent
Hemipedina	H. sp.		Slottsmøya Member		A species of pedinoid sea urchins related to the extant Caenopedina	Modern Caenopedina hawaiiensis from Hawaii
Polarasterias	P. janusensis		Slottsmøya Member	Nearly complete specimen	A forcipulatid sea star	
Savignaster	S. septemtrionalis		Slottsmøya Member		A pterasterid sea star	Modern pterasterid sea star from Washington state
Ophiogaleus	O. sp.		Slottsmøya Member		A ophiacanthid brittle star	
Ophioculina	O. hoybergia		Slottsmøya Member		An ophiurine brittle star	

==== Bivalves ====
Remains of possible anomiid clams have been found which are as yet undescribed.

Bivalves from the Agardhfjellet Formation
Genus	Species	Location	Member	Material	Notes	Images
Pseudotrapezium	P. aff. groelandicum		Slottsmøya Member		An arcticid clam which constitutes nearly half of the fauna recovered from the seep assemblages.	Another arcticid species, Arctica islandica, from an unknown location
Mesosaccella	M. rogovi		Slottsmøya Member			
Mesosaccella	M. toddi		Slottsmøya Member			
Nucinella	N. svalbardensis		Slottsmøya Member		The most abundant chemosymbiotic species in the Spitsbergen seeps.	
Buchia	B. sp		Slottsmøya Member			
Solemya	S. cf. woodwardiana		Slottsmøya Member		A burrowing chemosymbiotic bivalve which is very abundant in the seep sites	
Tehamatea	T. rasmusseni		Slottsmøya Member		A lucinid clam	Specimen of another lucinid species, Divaricella huttoniana, from New Zealand
Cretaxinus	C. hurumi		Slottsmøya Member		A thyacirid clam	
Camptonectes	C. spp		Slottsmøya Member		A pectinid clam represented by at least two species	
Oxytoma	O. octavia		Slottsmøya Member			
Pseudolimea	P. arctica		Slottsmøya Member			
Dacromya	D. chetaensis		Slottsmøya Member		Rare	Dacryomya lacryma, of Middle Jurassic age, from Bavaria, Germany
Goniomya	G. literata		Slottsmøya Member		Rare	

==== Serpulids ====
Serpulids from the Agardhfjellet Formation
Genus	Species	Location	Member	Material	Notes	Images
Propomatoceros	P. sp.		Slottsmøya Member		A serpulid tube worm	Modern serpulid, Spirobranchus giganteus, from East Timor
aff. Pyrgopolon	aff. P. nodulosum		Slottsmøya Member		A serpulid tube worm which forms mass accumulations in the Echinoderm Bed	
Nogrobs	N. sp.		Slottsmøya Member			

==== Brachiopods ====
Brachiopods from the Agardhfjellet Formation
Genus	Species	Location	Member	Material	Notes	Images
Lingularia	L. similis		Slottsmøya Member		The most abundant species of brachiopod that is present in Slottsmøya	
Ptilorhynchia	P. mclachlani		Slottsmøya Member		A rhynchonellide brachiopod	Specimens of another rhynchonellid species, Rhynchotrema dentatum, from Indiana

==== Gastropods ====
Gastropods from the Agardhfjellet Formation
Genus	Species	Location	Member	Material	Notes	Images
Ambercyclus	A. sp.		Slottsmøya Member		The most abundant species of gastropod that is known from the Slottsmøya seep deposits	
Hudlestoniella	H. sp.		Slottsmøya Member		A rissoid gastropod	
Cantrainea	C. sp.		Slottsmøya Member		A turbinid gastropod; it is rare and only known from one of the seep sites	Specimen of late Miocene age from Trinidad and Tobago

== See also ==
- List of fossiliferous stratigraphic units in Norway
- Tithonian formations
- Berriasian formations
