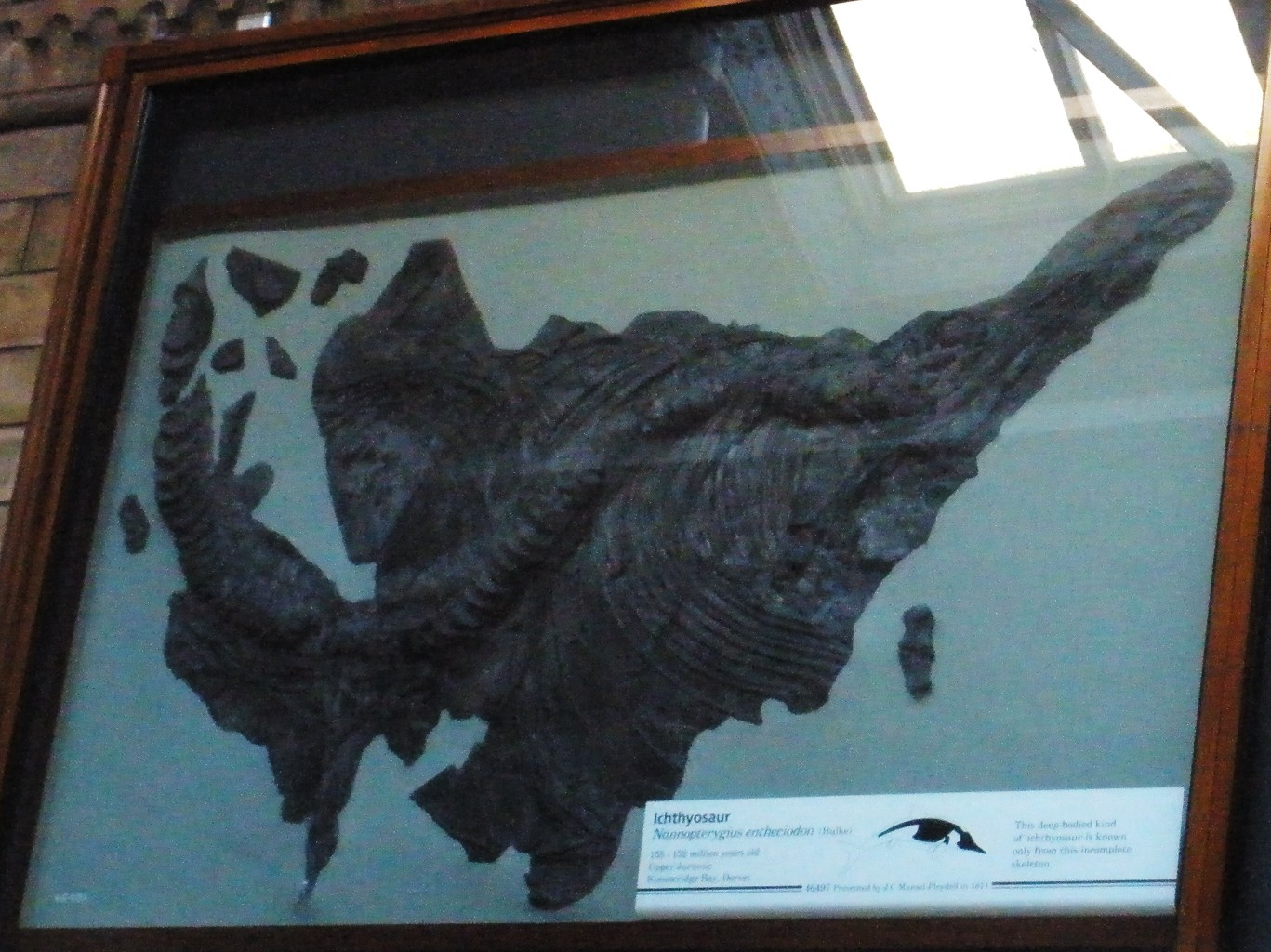
- Holotype of N. enthekiodon (NHMUK PV OR 46497), displayed at the Natural History Museum, London

Scientific classification
- Kingdom: Animalia
- Phylum: Chordata
- Class: Reptilia
- Order: †Ichthyosauria
- Family: †Ophthalmosauridae
- Genus: †Nannopterygius von Huene, 1922

Type species
- †Nannopterygius enthekiodon (Hulke, 1871 [originally Ichthyosaurus)

Other species
- †N. borealis Zverkov & Jacobs, 2020; †N. mikhailovi Yakupova & Akhmedenov, 2022; †N. saveljeviensis (Arkhangelsky, 1997); †N. yakimenkae Yakupova & Akhmedenov, 2022; †N. yasykovi (Efimov, 1999)

Synonyms
- Enthekiodon Hulke, 1870; Ichthyosaurus enthekiodon Hulke, 1871; Paraophthalmosaurus Arkhangelsky, 1997; Yasykovia Efimov, 1999; Yasykovia mittai? Efimov, 1999; Yasykovia sumini? Efimov, 1999

= Nannopterygius =

Nannopterygius Temporal range: Middle Jurassic to Early Cretaceous, Callovian–Berriasian

Extinct genus of reptiles

Nannopterygius (meaning "small wing/flipper" in Greek) is an extinct genus of ophthalmosaurid ichthyosaur that lived during the Middle Jurassic to the Early Cretaceous (Callovian to Berriasian stages). Fossils are known from England, Kazakhstan, Russia, and Norway and six species are currently assigned to the genus.

== Description ==
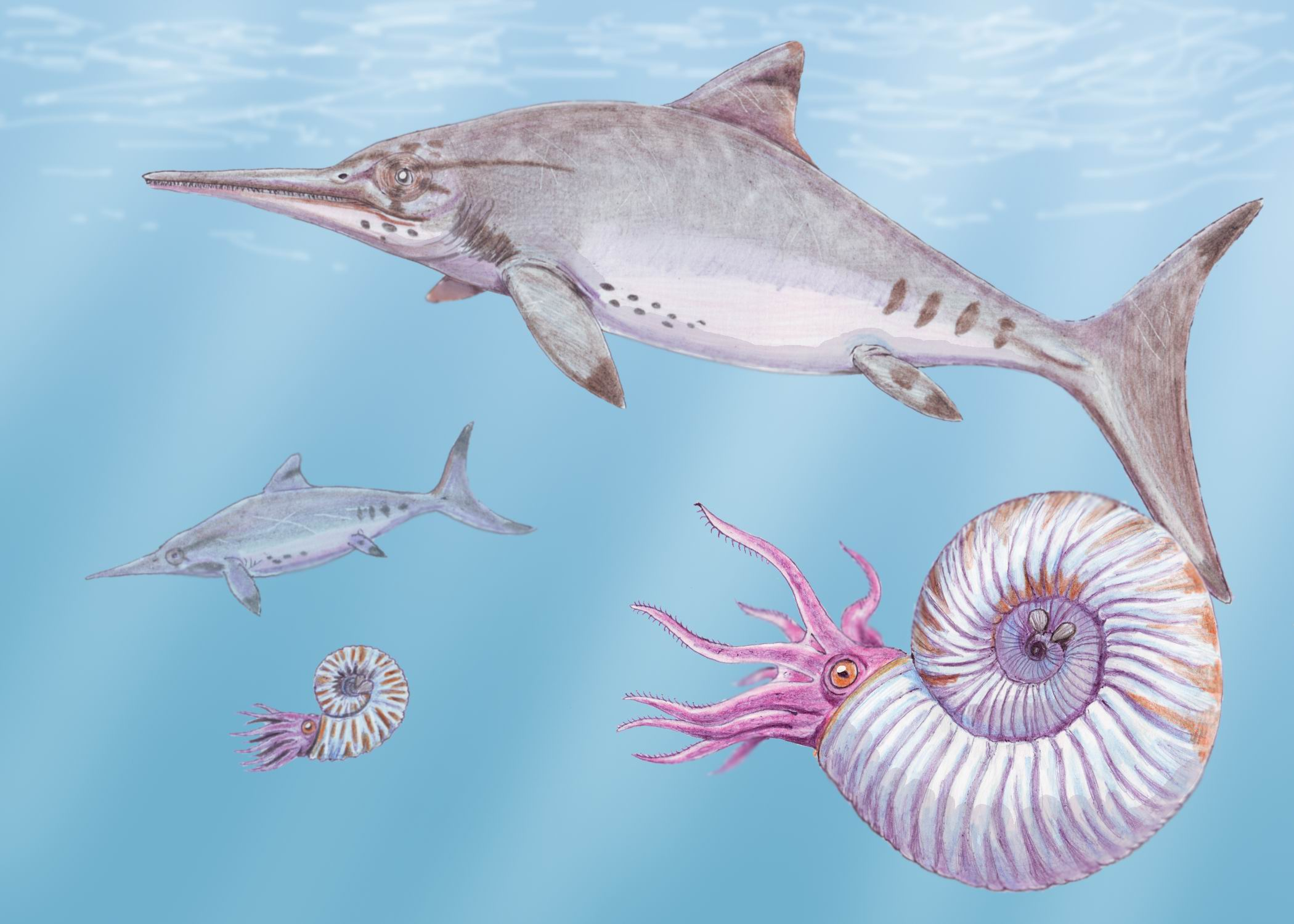
Nannopterygius yasykovi alongside two ammonites

Nannopterygius was small for an ichthyosaur, measuring up to 3.5 metres (11 ft) long at maximum. About 1 metre (3.3 ft) of this was tail, including a deeply forked and probably homocercal caudal fin. The head is 50 centimetres (20 in; 1.6 ft) long, with a typical long narrow rostrum. The eyes are large, hence its classification as an ophthalmosaurid, and have a bony scleral ring inside the eye socket. There are at least 60 disc-shaped vertebrae, although owing to the condition of the fossil it is not possible to tell exactly how many there were, showing that Nannopterygius was flexible, agile and probably a fast swimmer. The ribs are long and curved, but do not quite join up. Most of the features are very similar to the close relative Ophthalmosaurus. However, its paddles are much smaller, around 25–30 centimetres (9.8–11.8 in) for the forepaddles and only 10–15 centimetres (3.9–5.9 in) for the hindpaddles. This gave it a very streamlined, torpedo-shaped look, but would have made it quite difficult to generate much lift or to turn quickly, making it an inefficient long-distance swimmer but speedy over short distances. It is therefore possible that it was an ambush predator which plunged into shoals of fish quickly in the shallow seas where it lived.

== Discovery and Classification ==
The first specimen was found in the Kimmeridgian Kimmeridge Clay Formation of Kimmeridge Bay, Dorset, UK and described by Hulke in 1871, who named it Ichthyosaurus enthekiodon. This referred to its teeth being 'sheathed' in cementum and less likely to fall out than those of other ichthyosaurs. A year earlier, Hulke had described some remains from the same horizon and locality that he thought were ichthyosaurian, naming them Enthekiodon (no species given). These are now lost, but Hulke considered them sufficiently similar to demote the name to species level. In 1922, Friedrich von Huene separated this species into the new genus Nannopterygius, named for the small fore- and hindpaddles. The first fossil is the most complete, but is flattened. All subsequent fossils are fragmentary. In 2020, several more species, including N. borealis, and the species once contained in the genera Paraophthalmosaurus and Yasykovia were named based on remains found in Norway and Russia. The existence of two more species from Kazakhstan, N. mikhailovi and N. yakimenkae, was confirmed by Yakupova & Akhmedenov (2022).

The following cladogram shows a possible phylogenetic position of Nannopterygius, which was found to be the sister taxon to Thalassodraco, in Ophthalmosauria according to an analysis performed by Zverkov and Jacobs (2020).

- Ophthalmosauria
  - - Ophthalmosaurinae
      - - - - Acamptonectes densus
            - - Mollesaurus periallus
              - - Ophthalmosaurus natans
                - Ophthalmosaurus icenicus
      - - - Gengasaurus nicosiai
          - - - Nannopterygius yasykovi
              - - Nannopterygius enthekiodon
                - Nannopterygius saveljeviensis
                - Nannopterygius borealis
            - - - Arthropterygius volgensis
                - - Arthropterygius lundi
                  - Arthropterygius thalassonotus
                  - - Arthropterygius hoybergeti
                    - Arthropterygius chrisorum
    - Platypterygiinae
      - - Brachypterygius extremus
        - Aegirosaurus leptospondylus
        - - Muiscasaurus catheti
          - - Leninia stellans
            - - Sveltonectes insolitus
              - - Athabascasaurus bitumineus
                - - Platypterygius americanus
                  - - - Acuetzpalin carranzai
                      - Platypterygius sachicarum
                      - Caypullisaurus bonapartei
                    - - - - Grendelius mordax
                          - Grendelius alekseevi
                          - Grendelius pseudoscythicus
                          - Grendelius zhuravlevi
                        - - - - Undorosaurus kielanae
                              - - Undorosaurus nessovi
                                - Undorosaurus gorodischensis
                      - - Platypterygius australis
                        - - Plutoniosaurus bedengensis
                          - Simbirskiasaurus birjukovi
                          - Platypterygius hercynicus
                          - Sisteronia seeleyi
                          - Platypterygius platydactylus
                          - Maiaspondylus lindoei

== Paleoecology ==
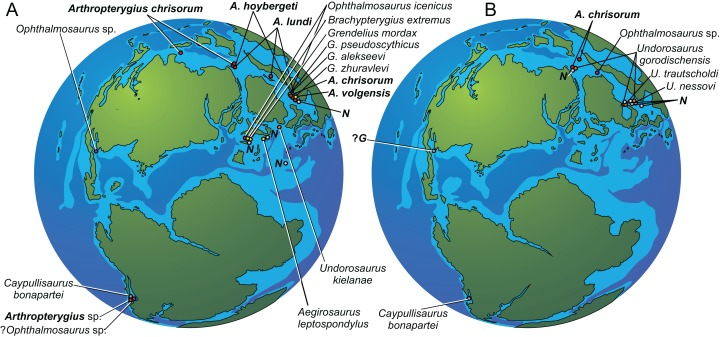
Biogeography of ophthalmosaurid ichthyosaurs of the (A) Kimmeridgian-Middle Volgian and (B) Middle-Late Volgian; Nannopterygius is represented by the letter N

The type species is known from the Kimmeridge Clay Formation in Dorset, England. The Kimmeridge Clay hosts a wealth of marine fossils dating to the Kimmeridgian and Tithonian stages of the Late Jurassic, many of which are incredibly well-preserved; however, very little has been published. At the time, Europe represented an island archipelago which was closer to the equator than it is today, surrounded by warm, tropical seas. The Kimmeridge Clay specifically represents an offshore marine environment, in which the seafloor was far enough below the surface not to be disturbed by storms. It was home to a great variety of marine life, including many cephalopods, fishes such as Thrissops and the early ray Kimmerobatis, and remains of occasional dinosaurs like Dacentrurus which had been washed out to sea. It is most famous for diversity of marine reptiles, such as the metriorhynchids Metriorhynchus and Plesiosuchus, the plesiosaurs Colymbosaurus and Kimmerosaurus, and the ichthyosaurs Grendelius and Thalassodraco. The apex predators of the Kimmeridge ecosystem would have been the several species of the pliosaurid Pliosaurus which have been recovered there, as well as large metriorhynchids like Plesiosuchus. Additionally, the pterosaurs Cuspicephalus and Rhamphorhynchus are also known from the Kimmeridge Clay.

The species N. yasykovi and N. saveljeviensis are known from the Volga region of Russia, which gives the Volgian stage its name. Though very little is known or published about the fossils of these localities, fossils of a number of marine animals have been recovered, including several species of the ichthyosaurs Arthropterygius, Grendelius, and Undorosaurus. In addition, fossils of the pliosaurid Pliosaurus rossicus and indeterminate remains belonging to a metriorhynchid, as well as a high diversity of ammonites including the large-bodied taxon Titanites, are also known from the Volgian-aged sediments of this region.

Additionally, the species N. borealis is known from earliest Cretaceous sediments of the Slottsmøya Member of the Agardhfjellet Formation. The Slottsmøya Member consists of a mix of shales and siltstones and was deposited in a shallow water methane seep environment. The seafloor, which was located about 150 metres (490 ft) below the surface, seems to have been relatively dysoxic, or oxygen-poor, although it was periodically oxygenated by clastic sediments. Despite this, near the top of the member, various diverse assemblages of invertebrates associated with cold seeps have been discovered; these include ammonites like Lytoceras and Phylloceras, lingulate brachiopods, bivalves like Myophorella and Laevitrigonia, rhynchonellate brachiopods, tubeworms, belemnoids, tusk shells, sponges like Peronidella, crinoids, sea urchins like Hemicidaris, brittle stars, starfish like Pentasteria, crustaceans like Eryma, and gastropods, numbering 54 taxa in total. Though direct evidence from Slottsmøya is currently lacking, the high latitude of this site and relatively cool global climate of the Tithonian mean that sea ice was likely present at least in the winter. In addition to Nannopterygius, the Slottsmøya Member presents a diverse assemblage of other marine reptiles, including the ichthyosaurs Undorosaurus gorodischensis, several species belonging to the genus Arthropterygius, and a partial skull attributed to Brachypterygius sp. The presence of these taxa indicates that there was significant faunal exchange across the seas of Northern Europe during this time period. Additionally, 21 plesiosaurian specimens are also known from the site, including two belonging to the large pliosaur Pliosaurus funkei, three to Colymbosaurus svalbardensis, one to Djupedalia engeri, one to Ophthalmothule cryostea, and one each to Spitrasaurus wensaasi and S. larseni. Many of these specimens are preserved in three dimensions and partially in articulation; this is correlated with high abundance of organic elements in the sediments they were buried in.

== See also ==
- List of ichthyosaurs
- Timeline of ichthyosaur research
