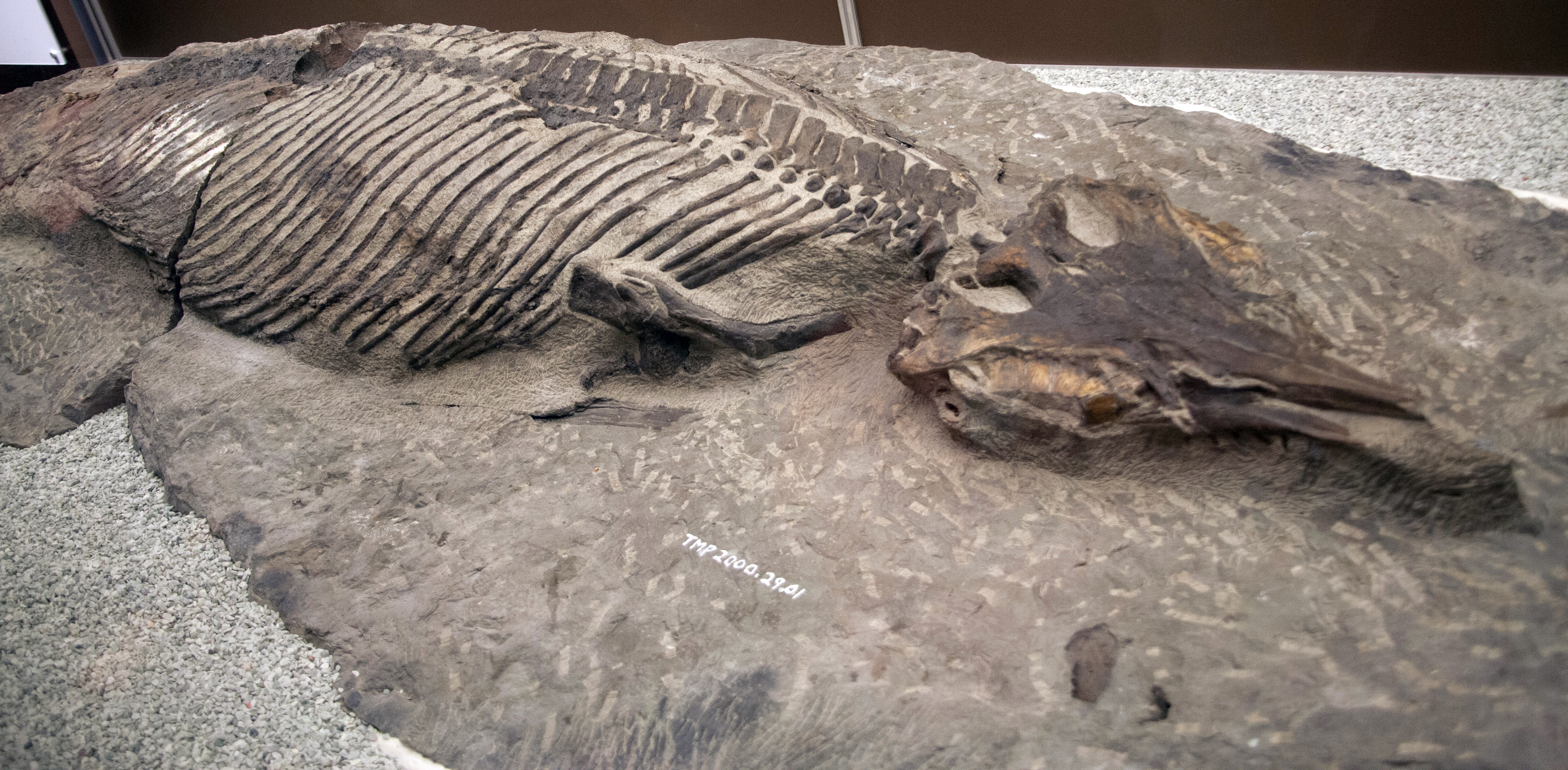
- Holotype specimen in Royal Tyrrell Museum of Palaeontology

Scientific classification
- Kingdom: Animalia
- Phylum: Chordata
- Class: Reptilia
- Order: †Ichthyosauria
- Family: †Ophthalmosauridae
- Subfamily: †Platypterygiinae
- Genus: †Athabascasaurus; Druckenmiller & Maxwell, 2010
- Species: †A. bitumineus

Binomial name
- †Athabascasaurus bitumineus Druckenmiller & Maxwell, 2010

= Athabascasaurus =

Athabascasaurus Temporal range: Lower Cretaceous, 112.6–109 Ma

Extinct genus of reptiles

Athabascasaurus is an extinct genus of platypterygiine ophthalmosaurid ichthyosaur known from Alberta, Canada.

== Discovery and etymology ==
Athabascasaurus is known from the holotype TMP 2000.29.01, articulated nearly complete postcranial skeleton and nearly complete skull preserved in dorsal view, missing the premaxilla. It was collected in 2000 on the western side of the Syncrude Canada Ltd.'s Base Mine, an open-pit mine near Fort McMurray. The specimen was found in the Wabiskaw Member of the Clearwater Formation, which dates to the earliest Albian stage of the Early Cretaceous epoch, about 112 million years ago. The specimen resides at the Royal Tyrrell Museum of Palaeontology.

Athabascasaurus was first named by Patrick S. Druckenmiller and Erin E. Maxwell in 2010 and the type species is Athabascasaurus bitumineus. The generic name is derived from the name of the Athabasca River, which runs through Athabasca oil sands area where the holotype was collected, and sauros, Greek for "lizard". The specific name refers to the fact that it was recovered at an oilsand mine.

== Description ==
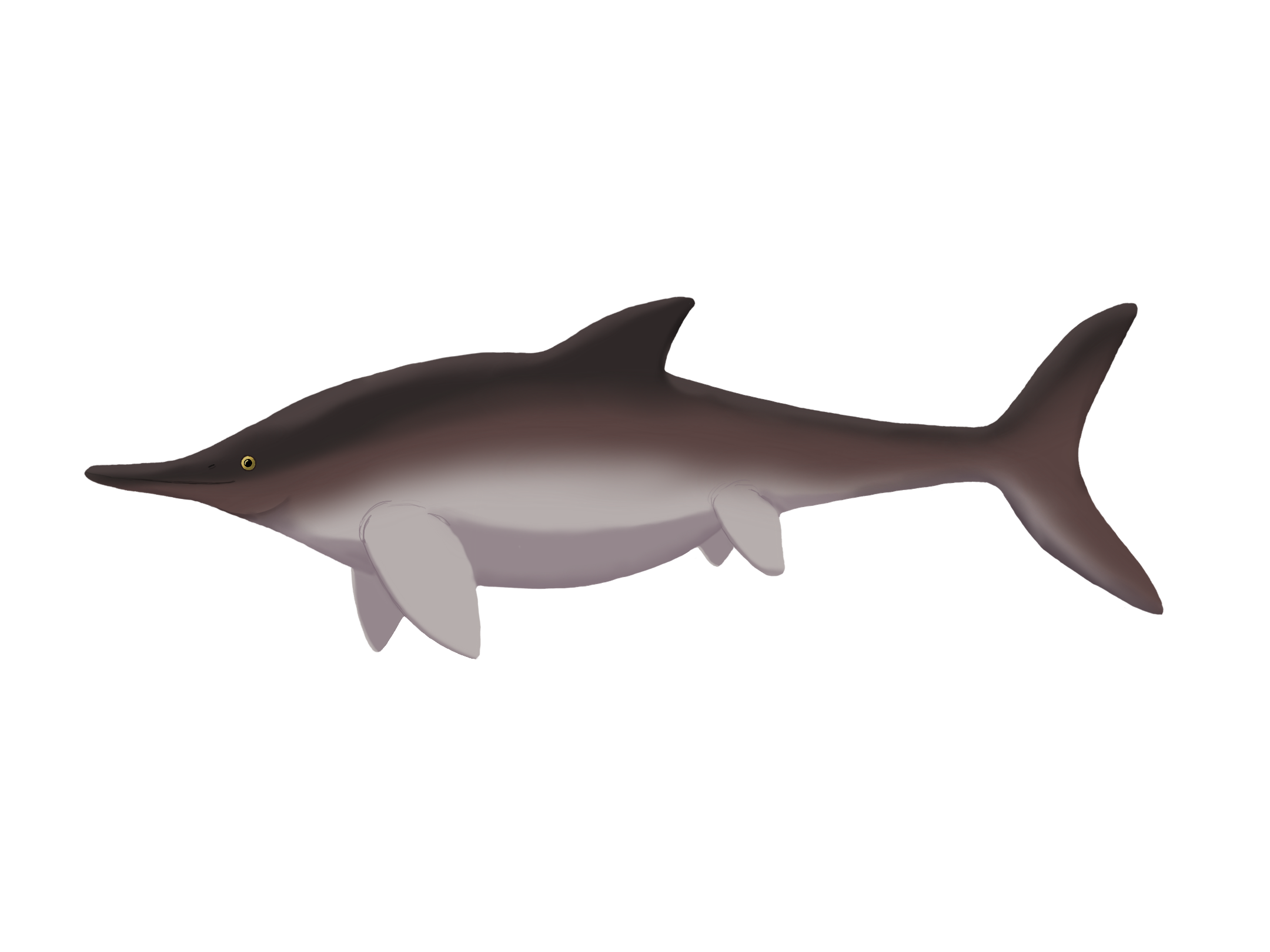
Life Reconstruction of Athabascasaurus

Athabascasaurus is a medium-sized ichthyosaur, measuring 3.5 m (11 ft) long.

The premaxillae (front upper toothed bones) of Athabascasaurus extend beneath the horizontally-oriented external nares (openings for the nostrils), overlying the maxillae (rear upper toothed bones). The maxillae are long, and extend upwards and fork into two ascending processes flanking the external naris, the rear one being the taller of the two and potentially reaching the prefrontal, one of the paired bones that form the upper edge of the orbit (eye socket). Much of the top of the snout consists of the enlarged nasals. The front portion of the orbit is formed by the slender lacrimals, which lack extensions reaching below the external nares. Within the orbits are the scleral rings, sets of small bones that supported the eyeballs. Each postfrontal (a paired skull roof bone) of Athabascasaurus bears a triangular projection that extends on top of the upper part of the adjacent postorbital (paired bones located behind the orbits), a unique feature of the genus. The frontals (paired skull roof bones) are not involved in the borders of the supratemporal fenestrae (large openings behind the orbits), but do enclose the majority of the pineal foramen (a small opening on the skull roof's midline), which expands from a slit into a rhomboidal shape at its front. The parietals (rear pair of skull roof bones), which bound the inner edges of the supratemporal fenestrae, do not form a sagittal crest.

Athabascasaurus possesses long, rectangular squamosals (a pair of skull roof bones). The supratemporals (paired rear skull roof bones) bear long processes that extend forwards, forming the exterior sides of the supratemporal fenestrae, though how far forward they reach is uncertain. The quadrates are bowed inwards, with their upper ends flared and their lower ends forming the jaw joint. The rear surfaces of the exoccipitals (a pair of braincase bones) are rugged, considered to provide a site where the occipital muscles anchored. The basioccipital's rear face is dominated by the large occipital condyle for articulation with the vertebral column. The conydle is not very strongly rounded and is surrounded by grooves. The inner ends of the shafted stapedes (paired braincase bones) are prominently expanded. Above the stapedes and to the sides of the basioccipital are the opisthotics, through which cranial nerve X passed through.

The rear part of the lower jaw externally is formed by the surangular and angular, with the latter overlapping the former and constituting the majority of the posterior mandible's outer surface. The articulars, which formed the jaw joint with the quadrate, are approximately quadrangular, with roughened ends that may have supported cartilage. The teeth of Athabascasaurus are implanted in a groove. While there appear to be rather substantial gaps between each tooth in the holotype, this may be an artifact of teeth falling out after death. Sparse, fine enamel ridges extend vertically along the sides of the thin, cone-shaped tooth crowns, which are otherwise smooth.

There are 42 vertebrae in front of the hips Athtabascasaurus, an unusually low number for ophthalmosaurs, with this series measuring 1.509 meters (4.95 ft) long in the holotype. The first two vertebrae (the atlas and axis) are entirely coalesced. Unique to Athabascasaurus, there is a forwards-pointing spur at the apex of the short atlantal neural spine. The clavicles (collarbones) straighten and flatten out towards the animal's midline. The two lower hip bones, the ischium and pubis, are fused into a single unit known as an ischiopubis. The ischiopubis narrows towards the hip socket. Unlike Ophthalmosaurus, there is no opening in the ischiopubis. There is an upwards-facing ridge on the femur.

== Classification ==
Two cladistic analyses by Fischer and colleagues, one in 2011 and the other in 2012, found it to be most closely related to "Platypterygius" australis, and to nest within Platypterygiinae.

=== Phylogeny ===
The following cladogram shows a possible phylogenetic position of Athabascasaurus in Ophthalmosauridae according to the analysis performed by Zverkov and Jacobs (2020).

- Ophthalmosauria
  - - Ophthalmosaurinae
      - - - - Acamptonectes densus
            - - Mollesaurus periallus
              - - Ophthalmosaurus natans
                - Ophthalmosaurus icenicus
      - - - Gengasaurus nicosiai
          - - - Nannopterygius yasykovi
              - - Nannopterygius enthekiodon
                - Nannopterygius saveljeviensis
                - Nannopterygius borealis
            - - - Arthropterygius volgensis
                - - Arthropterygius lundi
                  - Arthropterygius thalassonotus
                  - - Arthropterygius hoybergeti
                    - Arthropterygius chrisorum
    - Platypterygiinae
      - - Brachypterygius extremus
        - Aegirosaurus leptospondylus
        - - Muiscasaurus catheti
          - - Leninia stellans
            - - Sveltonectes insolitus
              - - Athabascasaurus bitumineus
                - - Platypterygius americanus
                  - - - Acuetzpalin carranzai
                      - Platypterygius sachicarum
                      - Caypullisaurus bonapartei
                    - - - - Grendelius mordax
                          - Grendelius alekseevi
                          - Grendelius pseudoscythicus
                          - Grendelius zhuravlevi
                        - - - - Undorosaurus kielanae
                              - - Undorosaurus nessovi
                                - Undorosaurus gorodischensis
                      - - Platypterygius australis
                        - - Plutoniosaurus bedengensis
                          - Simbirskiasaurus birjukovi
                          - Platypterygius hercynicus
                          - Sisteronia seeleyi
                          - Platypterygius platydactylus
                          - Maiaspondylus lindoei

== See also ==
- List of ichthyosaurs
- Timeline of ichthyosaur research
