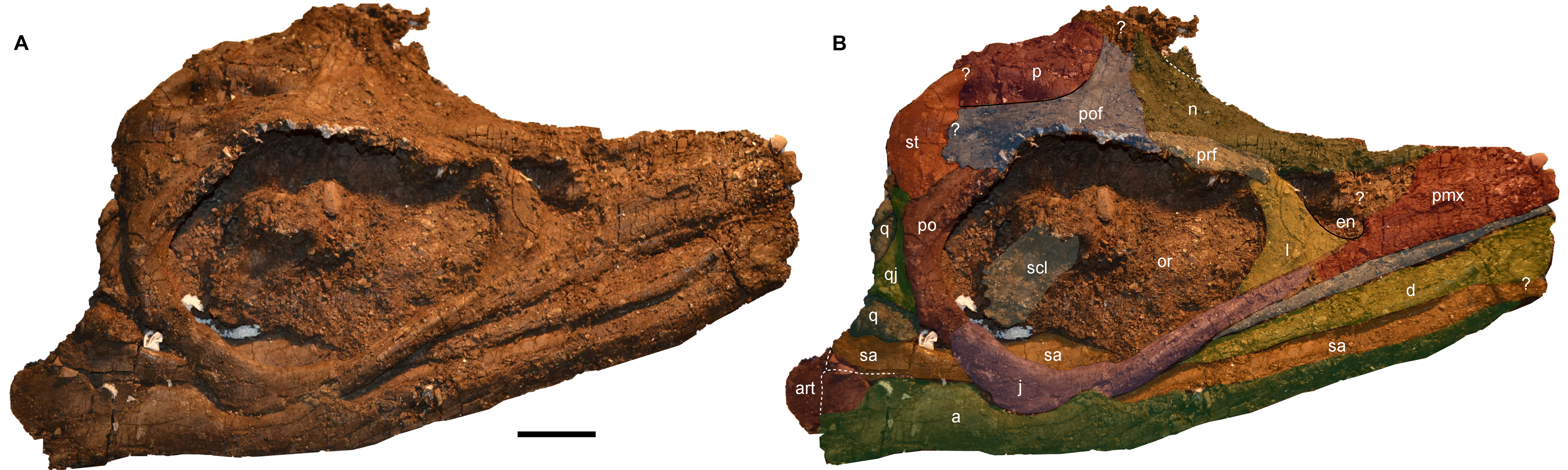
- Holotype skull

Scientific classification
- Kingdom: Animalia
- Phylum: Chordata
- Class: Reptilia
- Order: †Ichthyosauria
- Family: †Ophthalmosauridae
- Subfamily: †Ophthalmosaurinae
- Genus: †Janusaurus; Roberts et al., 2014
- Species: †J. lundi

Binomial name
- †Janusaurus lundi Roberts et al., 2014

= Janusaurus =

Janusaurus Temporal range: Tithonian ~150–146 Ma

Extinct genus of reptiles

Janusaurus is an extinct genus of ophthalmosaurid ichthyosaur from the Upper Jurassic Slottsmøya Member, Agardhfjellet Formation of Central Spitsbergen. The holotype consists of a partial skull and postcrania, and would have belonged to an individual measuring 3–4 m (9.8–13.1 ft) long. In 2019, Janusaurus was synonymized with Arthropterygius, though maintained as a separate species, by Nikolay Zverkov and Natalya Prilepskaya, although this synonymy was objected to later that same year by Lene Delsett and colleagues, who maintained that they were sufficiently different to warrant separate genera.

== Gallery ==
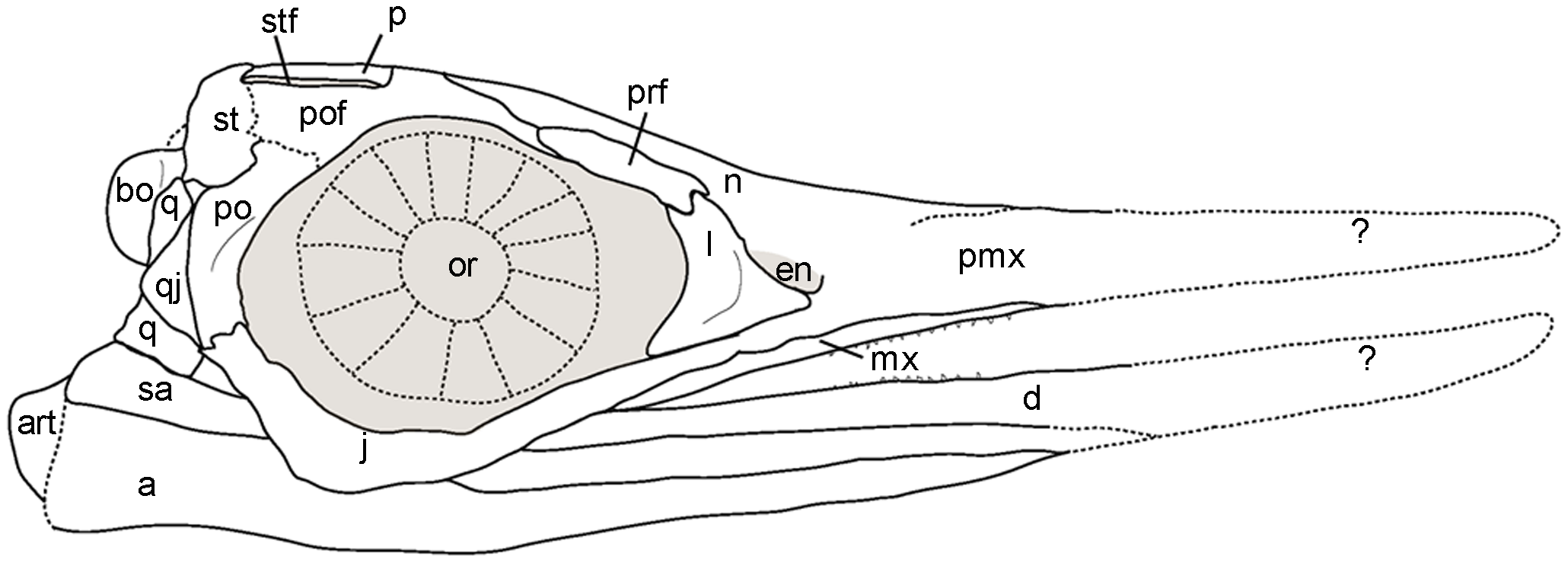
Restored skull

Video presentation

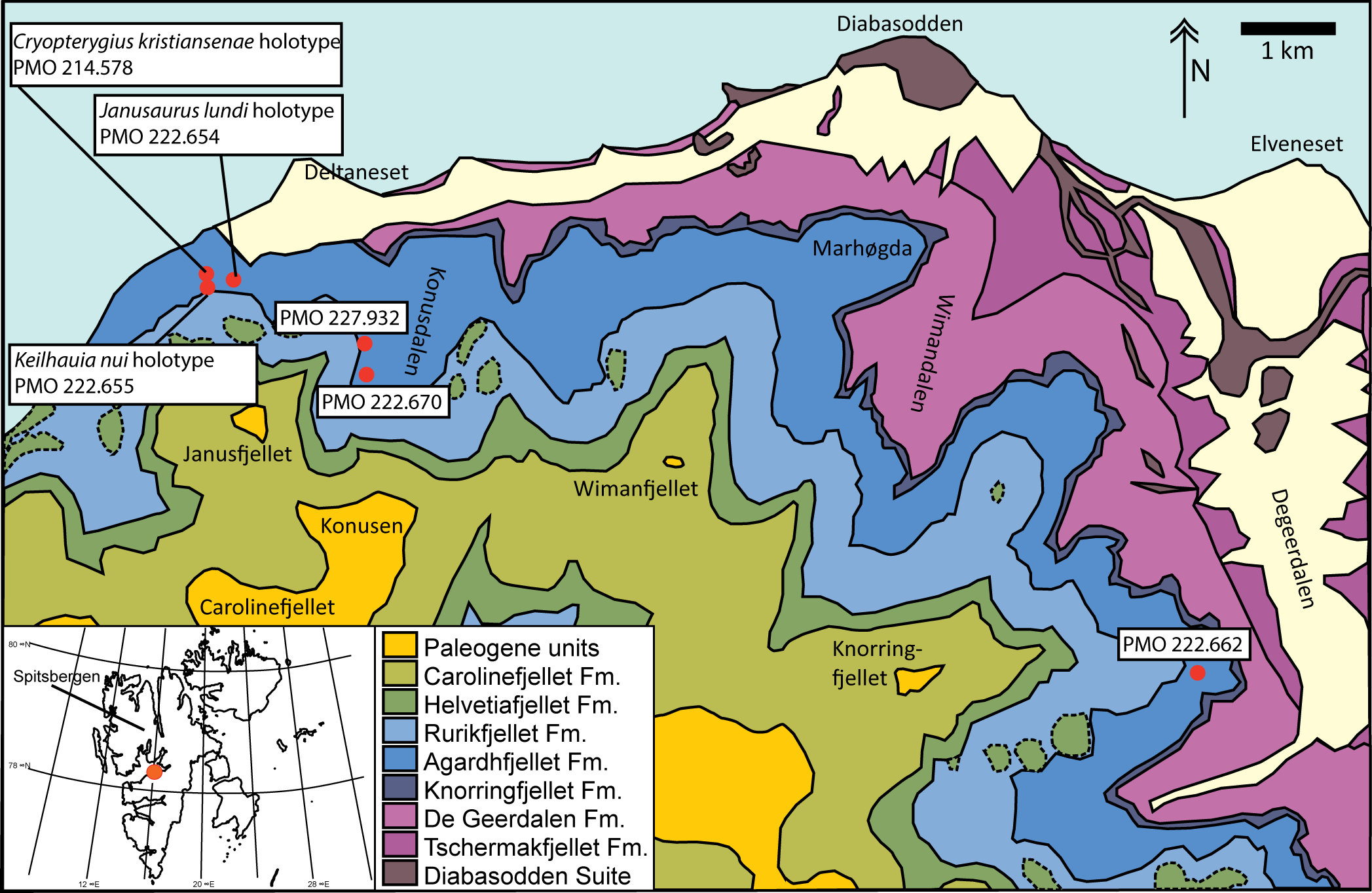
Map of fossil locality

== See also ==
- List of ichthyosaurs
- Timeline of ichthyosaur research
