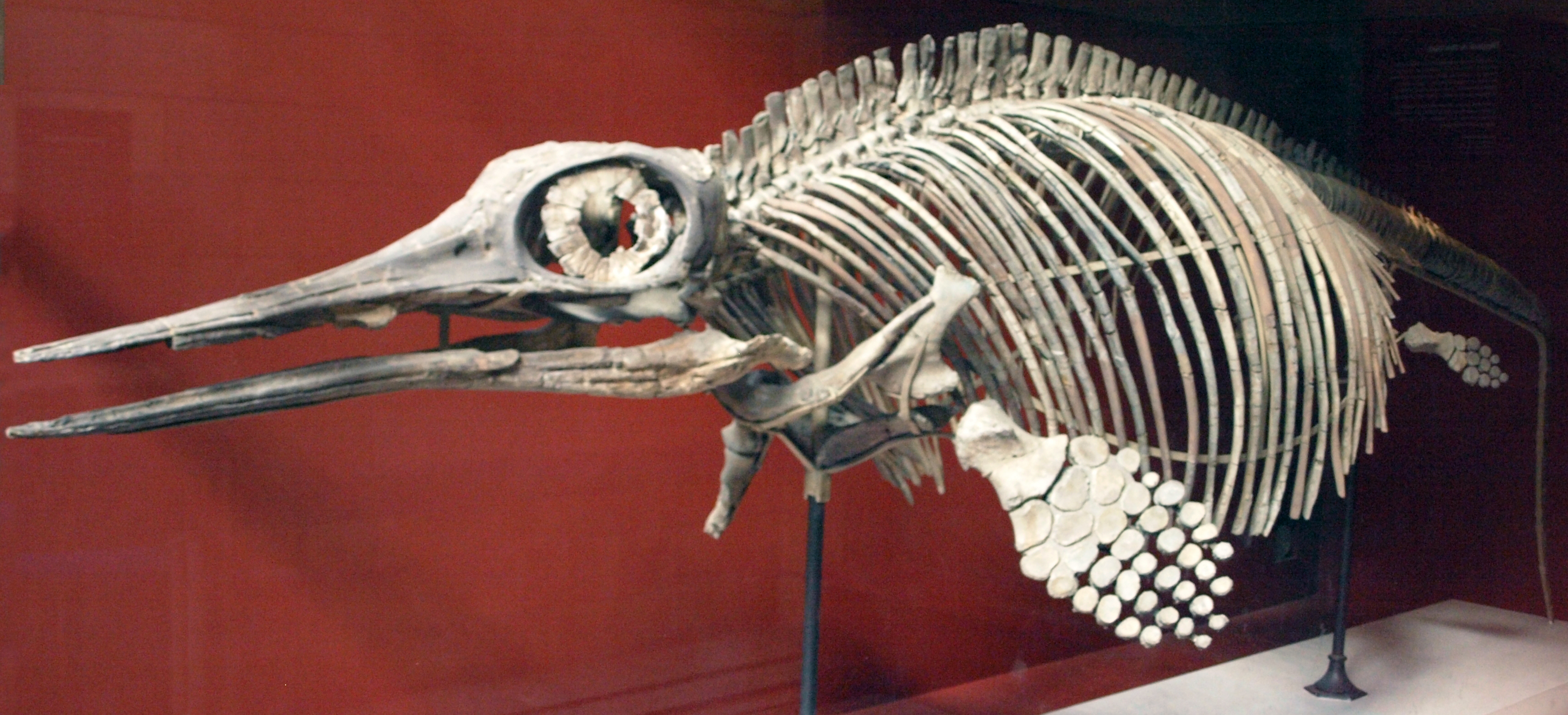
- Composite skeleton (NHMUK PV R3702, R3893, R4124) of Ophthalmosaurus icenicus at the Natural History Museum, London, with the forelimbs mounted backwards

Scientific classification
- Kingdom: Animalia
- Phylum: Chordata
- Class: Reptilia
- Order: †Ichthyosauria
- Family: †Ophthalmosauridae
- Subfamily: †Ophthalmosaurinae
- Genus: †Ophthalmosaurus; Seeley, 1874

Type species
- †Ophthalmosaurus icenicus Seeley, 1874

Species
- †O. icenicus Seeley, 1874 (type species)

Synonyms
- Ancanamunia Rusconi, 1942; Khudiakovia Arkhangelsky, 1999

= Ophthalmosaurus =

Ophthalmosaurus Temporal range: Middle Jurassic to Late Jurassic (Callovian to Oxfordian), 165–157 Ma Possible record during the Berriasian

Extinct genus of reptiles

Ophthalmosaurus (Greek ὀφθάλμος ophthalmos 'eye' and σαῦρος sauros 'lizard') is a genus of ichthyosaur known from the Middle-Late Jurassic. Possible remains from the earliest Cretaceous (Berriasian stage) are also known. It was a relatively medium-sized ichthyosaur, measuring 4 m (13 ft) long and weighing 940 kg (2,070 lb). Named for its extremely large eyes, it had a jaw containing many small but robust teeth. Major fossil finds of this genus have been recorded in Europe with a second species possibly being found in North America.

== Description ==
Life restoration of O. icenicus

Ophthalmosaurus was a medium-sized ichthyosaur, growing to measure 4 m (13 ft) in length and weighing between 930–950 kg (2,050–2,090 lb). It had a robust, streamlined body that was nearly as wide as it was tall in frontal view. Like other derived ichthyosaurs Ophthalmosaurus had a powerful tail ending in a pronounced bi-lobed caudal fluke whose lower half was formed around the caudal spine whereas the upper lobe was made up entirely from soft tissue. The limbs of Ophthalmosaurus were short and rounded with the forelimbs being noticeably larger than the hind limbs. The combination of rather inflexible trunk, powerful caudal fluke and reduced limbs suggests a tail-propelled mode of locomotion with the limbs helping with steering, differing from the anguilliform (eel-like) way more basal ichthyosaurs swam. The skull of Ophthalmosaurus was long with a slender, toothed rostrum and an enlarged posterior portion of the cranium. The dentition was relatively small with robust tooth crowns and the lateral area of the cranium was almost entirely occupied by the animal's massive eyes that gave the genus its name. The proportionally large eyes of Ophthalmosaurus measured 22–23 centimetres (8.7–9.1 in) in diameter at the outer margin of the bony scleral ring, while the scleral aperture itself measured 10 centimetres (3.9 in) in diameter.

== Discovery and species ==
Ophthalmosaurus was first described by Harry Seeley in 1874 with particular focus on the morphology of the clavicular bones. Over the years following its description a variety of genera have been sunk into Ophthalmosaurus. Among them, Apatodontosaurus, Ancanamunia, Baptanodon, Mollesaurus, Paraophthalmosaurus, Undorosaurus and Yasykovia were all considered junior synonyms of Ophthalmosaurus in a study published by Maisch & Matzke in 2000.

However, more recent cladistic analyses have contested Maisch & Matzke's conclusion. Mollesaurus periallus from Argentina was considered a valid genus of ophthalmosaurid by Druckenmiller and Maxwell (2010), Paraophthalmosaurus and Yasykovia were both recovered as distinct genera by Storrs et al., but were later sunk into Nannopterygius while Undorosaurus's validity is now accepted by most authors, including Maisch (2010) who originally proposed the synonymy. The two other Russian taxa might be also valid. Likewise the Mexican ophthalmosaurid Jabalisaurus had also been referred to Ophthalmosaurus before being described as a distinct species and genus in 2021.

Ophthalmosaurus natans was described as Sauranodon, then later renamed to Baptanodon by Marsh in 1880. However this decision was questioned not long afterwards with Baptanodon instead being considered an American species of Ophthalmosaurus. Recent analysis have recovered the species as closer to other ophthalmosaurines than to the Ophthalmosaurus type species, suggesting that the previous name should be reinstated. Similarly, Ophthalmosaurus chrisorum, whose holotype has been recovered in Canada and described by Russell in 1993, was moved to its own genus Arthropterygius in 2010 by Maxwell.

While primarily known from the Jurassic, material from the Spilsby Sandstone dating to the early Berriasian stage of the Lower Cretaceous has been referred to cf. Ophthalmosaurus (i.e., either Ophthalmosaurus or a closely related species).

== Classification ==
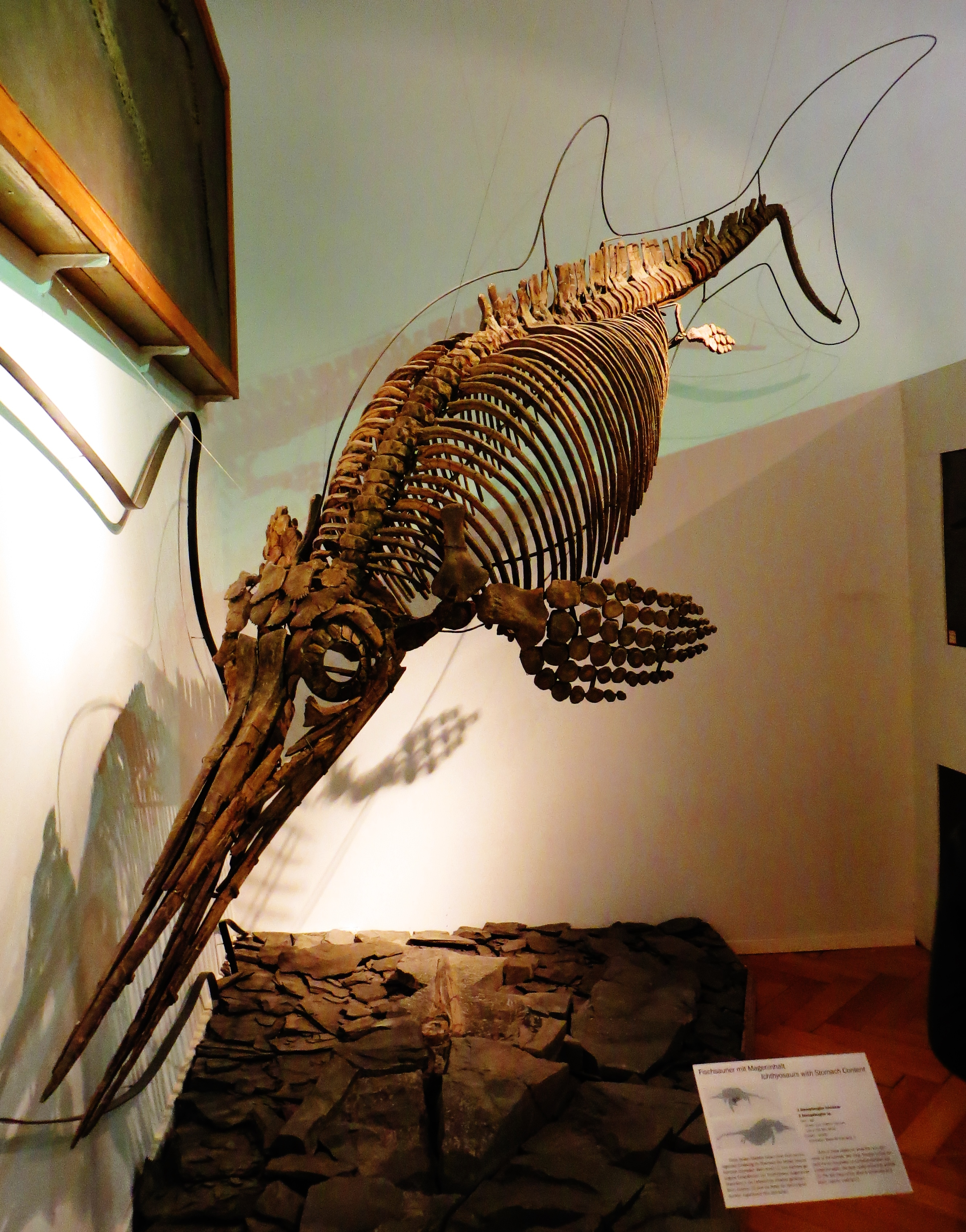
O. icenicus in Tübingen

Within Ophthalmosauridae, Ophthalmosaurus was once considered most closely related to Aegirosaurus. However, many recent cladistic analyses found Ophthalmosaurus to nest in a clade with Acamptonectes and Mollesaurus. Aegirosaurus was found more closely related to Platypterygius, and thus does not belong to the Ophthalmosaurinae.

=== Phylogeny ===
The cladogram below follows Fischer et al. 2012.

- Thunnosauria
  - Ichthyosaurus
  - - Stenopterygius
    - - Chacaicosaurus
      - Ophthalmosauridae
        - Arthropterygius
        - *
          - Ophthalmosaurinae
            - Mollesaurus
            - - Ophthalmosaurus icenicus (type species)
              - - Baptanodon ("O." natans)
                - Acamptonectes
          - Platypterygiinae
            - - Brachypterygius
              - - Maiaspondylus
                - - Aegirosaurus
                  - Sveltonectes
            - - "Platypterygius" hercynicus
              - - Caypullisaurus
                - - Athabascasaurus
                  - "Platypterygius" australis (=Longirostria)

The following cladogram shows a possible phylogenetic position of Ophthalmosaurus in Ophthalmosauridae according to the analysis performed by Zverkov and Jacobs (2020).

- Ophthalmosauria
  - - Ophthalmosaurinae
      - - - - Acamptonectes densus
            - - Mollesaurus periallus
              - - Ophthalmosaurus natans
                - Ophthalmosaurus icenicus
      - - - Gengasaurus nicosiai
          - - - Nannopterygius yasykovi
              - - Nannopterygius enthekiodon
                - Nannopterygius saveljeviensis
                - Nannopterygius borealis
            - - - Arthropterygius volgensis
                - - Arthropterygius lundi
                  - Arthropterygius thalassonotus
                  - - Arthropterygius hoybergeti
                    - Arthropterygius chrisorum
    - Platypterygiinae
      - - Brachypterygius extremus
        - Aegirosaurus leptospondylus
        - - Muiscasaurus catheti
          - - Leninia stellans
            - - Sveltonectes insolitus
              - - Athabascasaurus bitumineus
                - - Platypterygius americanus
                  - - - Acuetzpalin carranzai
                      - Platypterygius sachicarum
                      - Caypullisaurus bonapartei
                    - - - - Grendelius mordax
                          - Grendelius alekseevi
                          - Grendelius pseudoscythicus
                          - Grendelius zhuravlevi
                        - - - - Undorosaurus kielanae
                              - - Undorosaurus nessovi
                                - Undorosaurus gorodischensis
                      - - Platypterygius australis
                        - - Plutoniosaurus bedengensis
                          - Simbirskiasaurus birjukovi
                          - Platypterygius hercynicus
                          - Sisteronia seeleyi
                          - Platypterygius platydactylus
                          - Maiaspondylus lindoei

== Palaeobiology ==
Ophthalmosaurus icenicus possessed small teeth with robust tooth crowns and signs of slight wear differing notably from the robust teeth of later species of Platypterygius, known to have hunted large prey including turtles and birds, and the minute teeth of Baptanodon, interpreted to be a soft prey specialist. Fischer et al. (2016) conclude that this intermediary tooth morphology indicates that Ophthalmosaurus icenicus was most likely a generalist predator, feeding on a variety of smaller prey items.

Ophthalmosaurus could likely dive for around 20 minutes. Assuming a conservative cruising speed of 1 metre per second (3.3 ft/s) (2 metres per second (6.6 ft/s) being more likely), Ophthalmosaurus could reach depths of 600 metres (2,000 ft) or more during a dive, reaching the mesopelagic zone. However, while studies on the biomechanics of Ophthalmosaurus suggests that such feats could be physically achieved, studies on the environment of the Peterborough member of the Oxford Clay suggest that Ophthalmosaurus instead inhabited relatively shallow waters there, being determined to have been just 50 metres (160 ft) deep at a distance of 150 kilometres (93 mi) from the shore.

== See also ==
- List of ichthyosaurs
- Timeline of ichthyosaur research
