= Palvennia =

Palvennia Temporal range: Tithonian ~150–145 Ma

Scientific classification
- Kingdom: Animalia
- Phylum: Chordata
- Class: Reptilia
- Superorder: †Ichthyopterygia
- Order: †Ichthyosauria
- Family: †Ophthalmosauridae
- Genus: †Palvennia; Druckenmiller et al., 2012

Type species
- †Palvennia hoybergeti Druckenmiller et al., 2012

Extinct genus of reptiles

Palvennia is an extinct genus of ophthalmosaurid ichthyosaurian known from the uppermost Jurassic of Central Spitsbergen, Norway. It was named for PalVenn, the Friends of the Palaeontological Museum in Oslo, whose expedition led to the discovery of the type specimen. Palvennia was a medium-sized ichthyosaur, measuring 3–4 m (9.8–13.1 ft) long. It was originally known from a single skull from the Slottsmøya Member of the Agardhfjellet Formation (middle Volgian/late Tithonian, Late Jurassic) that measures 86 cm (2 ft 10 in) long. It is unusual in having a very short rostrum (~0.6× the skull length), similar to Ichthyosaurus breviceps. Because of this, the orbit seems very large (0.34× the skull length), but this may be affected by crushing. The single and only known species is Palvennia hoybergeti Druckenmiller et al., 2012. A second specimen, which included both cranial and anterior postcranial material, was described in 2018. In 2019, Palvennia was synonymized with Arthropterygius, though maintained as a separate species, by Nikolay Zverkov and Natalya Prilepskaya, although this synonymy was objected to later that same year by Lene Delsett and colleagues, who maintained that they were sufficiently different to warrant separate genera.

== See also ==
- List of ichthyosaurs
- Timeline of ichthyosaur research
