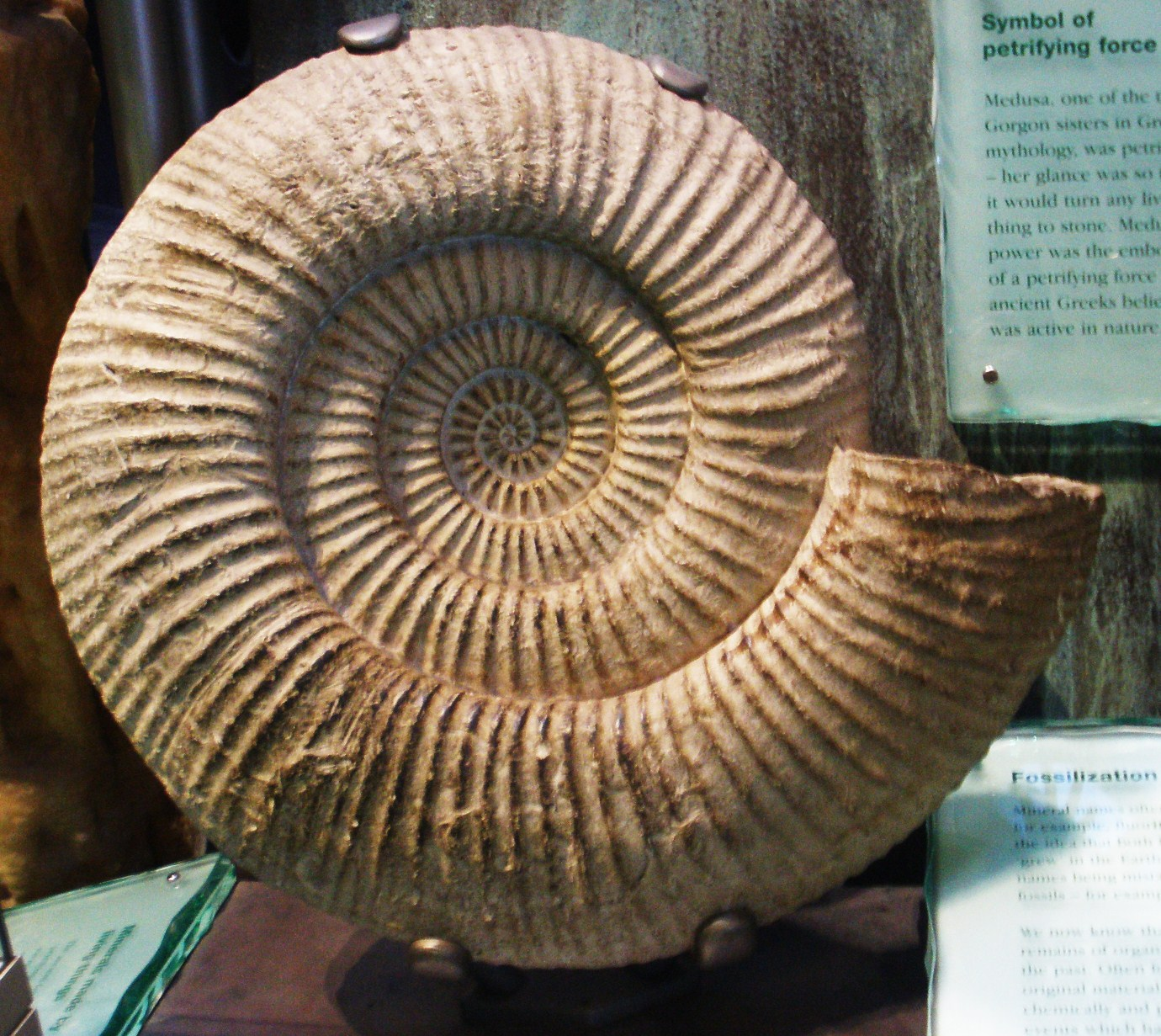
- Titanites giganteus – Jurassic from Dorset England, c. 147 Ma, at the Natural History Museum

Scientific classification
- Kingdom: Animalia
- Phylum: Mollusca
- Class: Cephalopoda
- Subclass: Ammonoidea
- Family: Dorsoplanitidae
- Genus: Titanites S.S. Buckman 1921

Species
- T. anguiformis Wimbledon and Cope, 1978; T. chilensis Biro-Bagoczky, 1976; T. cingulatus (de Haan, 1825); T. giganteus (Sowerby, 1818)

= Titanites =

Titanites Temporal range: Tithonian

Genus of molluscs (fossil)

Titanites is an extinct ammonite cephalopod genus within the family Dorsoplanitidae, that lived during the late Tithonian of the Late Jurassic. Its fossils have been found in Canada and the United Kingdom.

== Description ==
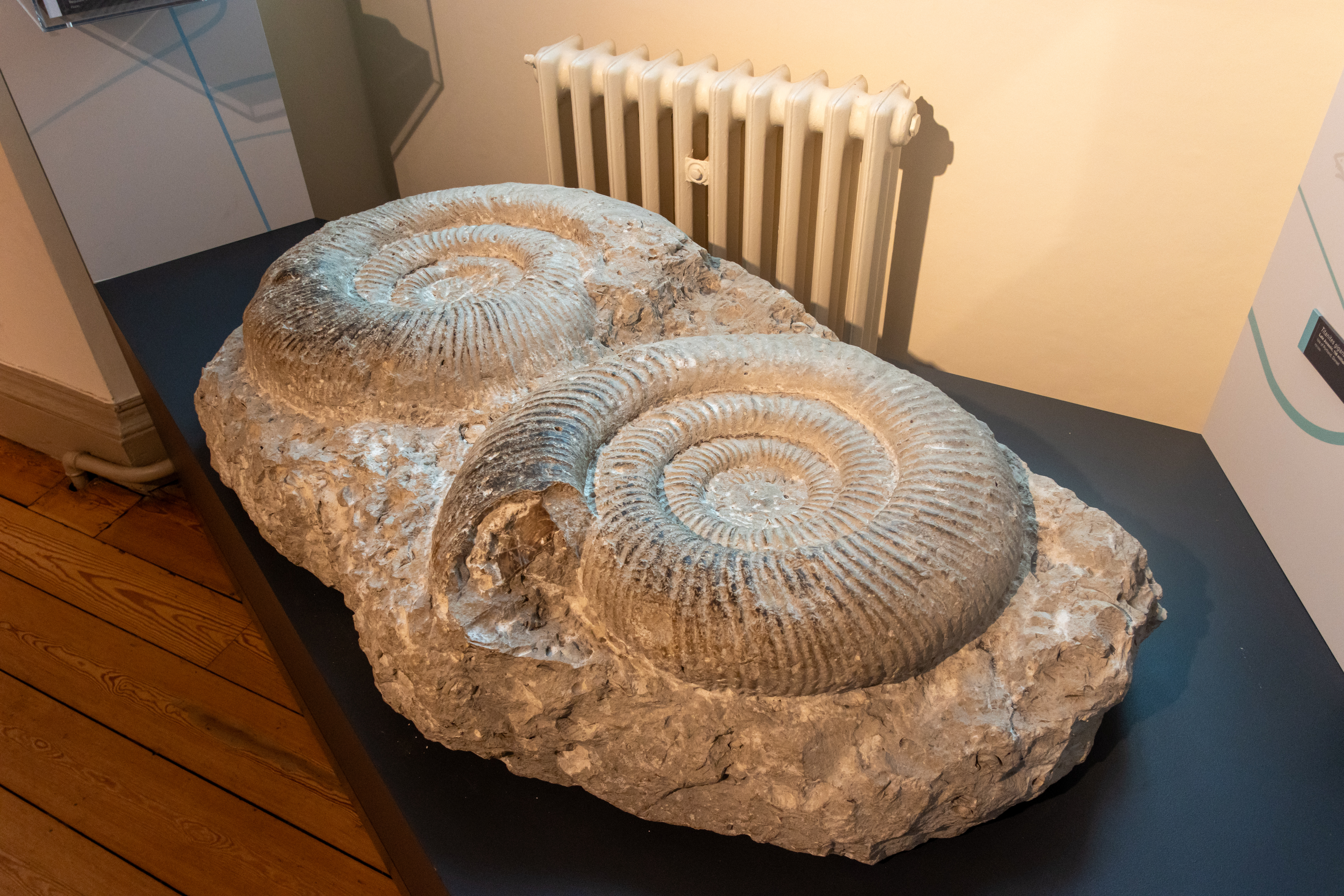
A pair of Titanites giganteus fossils at Wollaton Hall

Species of the genus Titanites can reach large sizes, with a diameter over 60 centimetres (2.0 ft) for Titanites giganteus and 90 centimetres (3.0 ft) for T. anguiformis. Much larger species, Titanites occidentalis with estimated diameter about 137 centimetres (4.49 ft) is reassigned to genus Corbinites. They were fast-moving nektonic carnivores.
