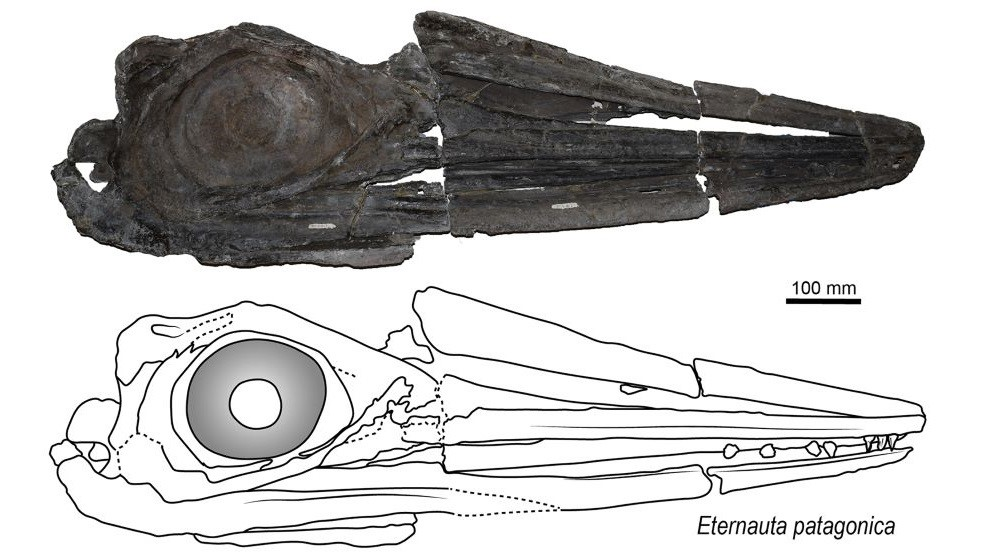
- Skull of Eternauta patagonica (photograph and diagram in right view)

Scientific classification
- Kingdom: Animalia
- Phylum: Chordata
- Class: Reptilia
- Order: †Ichthyosauria
- Family: †Ophthalmosauridae
- Subfamily: †Platypterygiinae
- Genus: †Eternauta; Campos et al., 2025
- Species: †E. patagonica

Binomial name
- †Eternauta patagonica Campos et al., 2025

= Eternauta patagonica =

Eternauta patagonica Temporal range: Late Jurassic, Tithonian

Genus of ichthyosaurs

Eternauta patagonica is an extinct species of ophthalmosaurid ichthyosaurian known from the Late Jurassic (Tithonian age) Vaca Muerta Formation of Argentina. E. patagonica is the only species in the genus Eternauta, known from a nearly complete skull with an associated rib and front flipper. The anatomy of the mandible and scleral ring indicate Eternauta had a different feeding strategy compared to other ichthyosaurs it coexisted with.

== Discovery and naming ==
Eternauta type locality at Chacay Melehue, Argentina

The Eternauta holotype specimen, MLP-PV 85-I-15–1, was discovered in outcrops of the Vaca Muerta Formation (Mendoza Group) in the Chacay Melehue locality in Neuquén Province of Argentine Patagonia. The specimen consists of a nearly complete, albeit laterally compressed, skull that is mostly viewable from the right side, a dorsal rib, and a right forelimb (humerus, radius, ulna, and carpals, missing the phalanges).

In 1990, Zulma B. de Gasparini & Ricardo G. Goñi tentatively identified the specimen as belonging to the ophthalmosaurid genus Platypterygius, albeit without discussion or a description of the anatomy. In 1997, Marta S. Fernández described the new ichthyosaur taxon Caypullisaurus bonapartei based on two partially articulated skeletons from the Vaca Muerta Formation. Fernández subsequently described specimen MLP-PV 85-I-15–1 and assigned it to this species based on similar shapes of the snout, external naris ('nostril' region of the skull), and front flipper.

In 2025, Lisandro Campos and colleagues reanalyzed and described MLP-PV 85-I-15–1, concluding that it demonstrates sufficient differences from Caypullisaurus and other ichthyosaurs to warrant a new name. As such, they named Eternauta patagonica based on these fossil remains. The generic name, Eternauta, combines the Latin words aeternus, meaning 'eternal', and nauta, meaning 'sailor', referencing the Argentine science fiction comic The Eternaut (Spanish: El Eternauta), in which the protagonist is introduced as "a navigator of time, a traveller of eternity, and a pilgrim of the centuries". The specific name, patagonica, references the region of Patagonia, in which the holotype was discovered. The intended translation of the full binomial name is 'the one who navigates eternally in Patagonia'.

Eternauta patagonica is one of many ichthyosaur species named from the Vaca Muerta Formation, following Caypullisaurus bonapartei (1997), Arthropterygius thalassonotus (2019), Catutosaurus gaspariniae (2021), and Sumpalla argentina (2021).

== Description and paleobiology ==
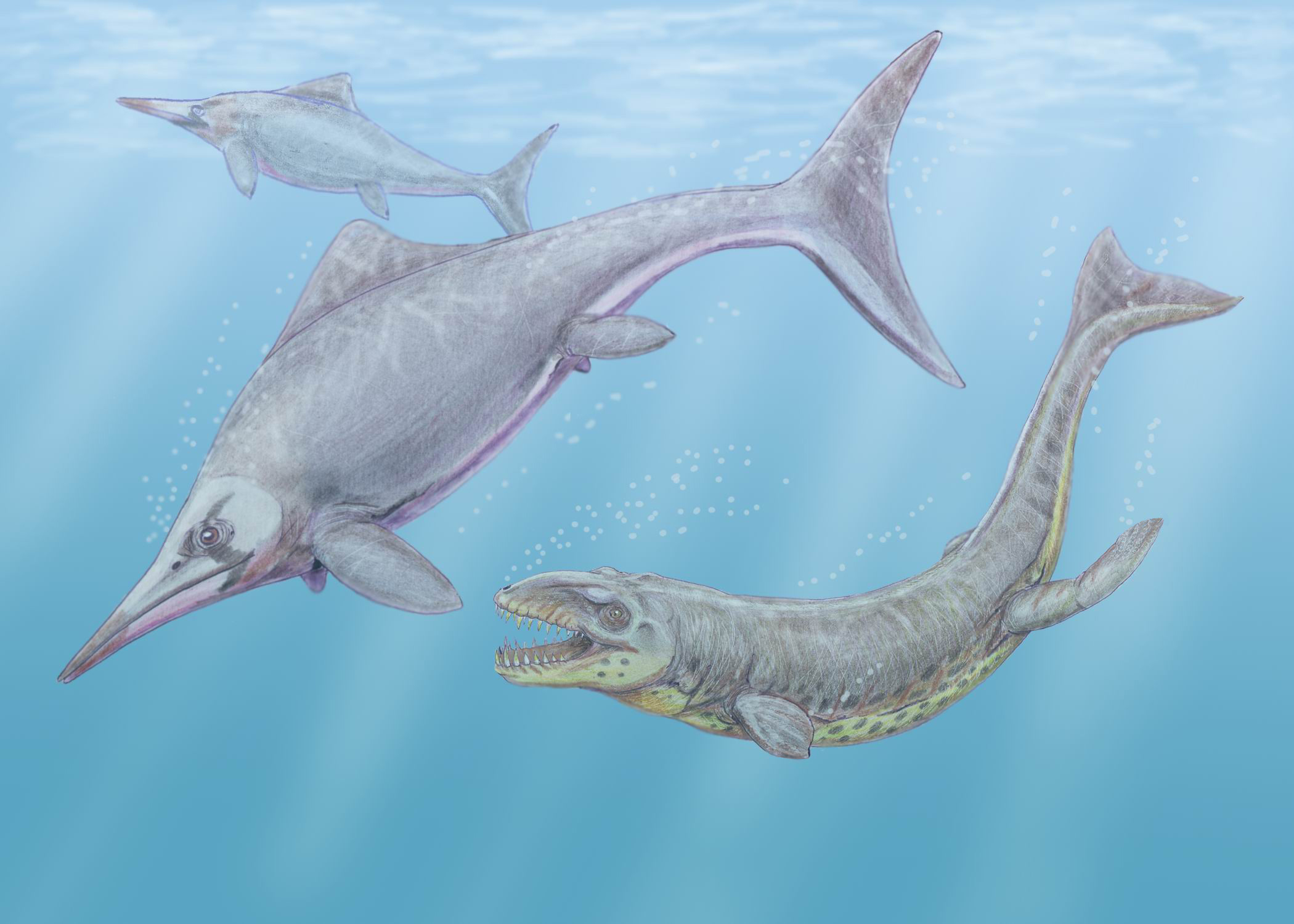
Speculative life restoration of the coeval thalattosuchian Dakosaurus and fellow ichthyosaur Caypullisaurus

The postorbital region is particularly distinct in Eternauta, and is informative in distinguishing it from Caypullisaurus. In the former, the postorbital bone is weakly developed anteroposteriorly (front-to-back), the quadratojugal is not well-exposed laterally (seen from the side), and the ventral margin of the bone is poorly-developed. In contrast, the postorbital bone of Caypullisaurus is well-developed and elongated anteroposteriorly, the quadratojugal is well-exposed laterally, and the ventral margin is well-developed. In Eternauta, the postorbital extends significantly below the orbit, forming more than half of its ventral (lower) margin, while it is more posteriorly restricted (toward the rear of the skull) in Caypullisaurus. This extension of the postorbital is recognized as an autapomorphy (unique derived character) of this taxon. Furthermore, there is no evidence Eternauta had a squamosal bone, as is expected for ichthyosaurs, while Caypullisaurus does have them.

The posterior region of the mandible is also distinct in Eternauta. The retroarticular process is slender and inclined dorsally (upwards), while in Caypullisaurus it is more robust, projecting horizontally. This strong angle in Eternauta is identified as another autapomorphy. The mandible anatomy suggests it was capable of precise, fast jaw movement, allowing it to prey on small and agile animals. This is comparable to the predicted feeding strategy of Hauffiopteryx, which had a remarkably gracile rostrum. This feeding strategy is contrasted to the more forceful biting predicted for some other ichthyosaurs such as Kyhytysuka and Caypullisaurus. Potential prey items of Eternauta found in the Vaca Muerta Formation include ammonites and belemnites, and pachycormid, aspidorhynchiform, and caturid fishes.

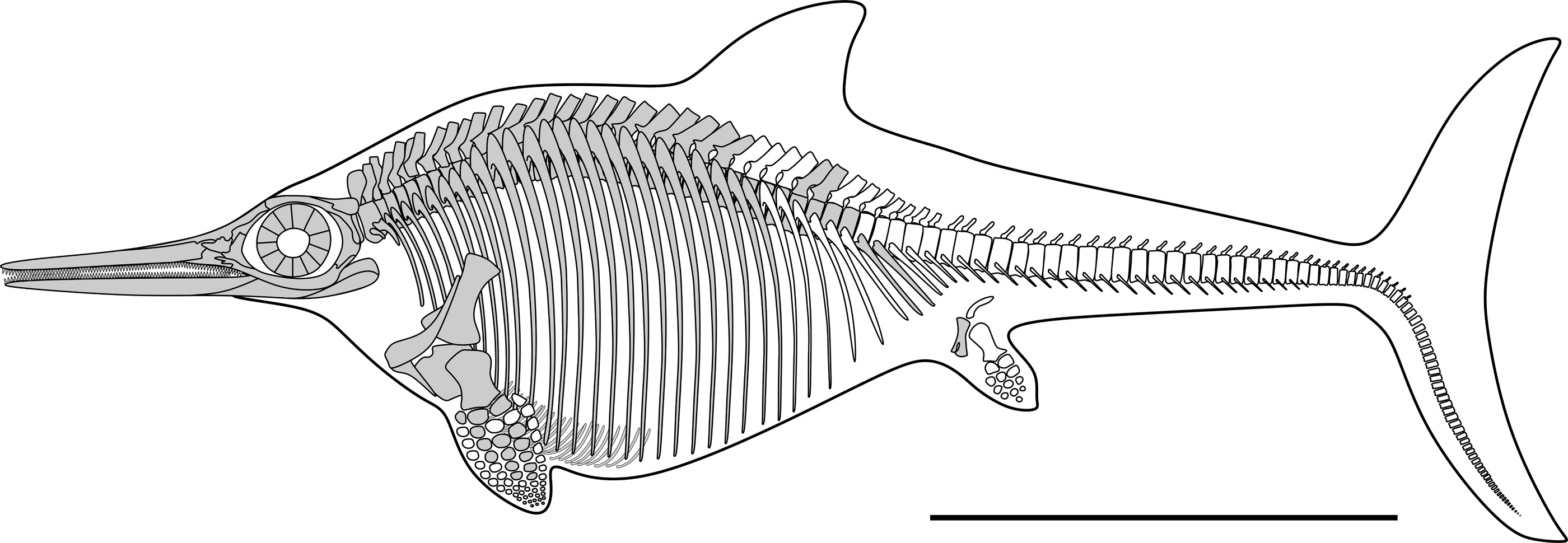
Reconstructed skeleton of the fellow platypterygiine Thalassodraco with large illustrated scleral rings

The scleral ring preserved in the orbit of the holotype is enlarged as in most ichthyosaurs, allowing for better vision in low-light pelagic environments. A scleral ring filling the orbit has been hypothesized to be indicative of deep-diving behavior in these animals. The combination of unique mandibular and optic characters indicates a degree of niche partitioning and different feeding behaviors in ichthyosaurs, including those coexisting in the Vaca Merta Formation environment.

== Classification ==
To determine the relationships and affinities of Eternauta, Campos and colleagues (2025) scored this taxon in a modified and updated version of the phylogenetic dataset of Campos et al. (2024), which is in turn modified from Campos et al. (2019). In their unweighted maximum parsimony analysis, the researchers recovered Eternauta as the sister taxon to an unresolved clade containing Acamptonectes, Gengasaurus, and Sumpalla. This clade was in turn found to be the sister to Undorosaurus spp. In contrast, their implied weighting (k = 3) maximum parsimony analysis recovered significantly different results, with Eternauta diverging before Athabascasaurus. Sumpalla was found as a member of a clade diverging immediately before Eternauta. In both analyses, Eternauta was recognized as a member of the ophthalmosaurid clade Platypterygiinae. In this second analysis, Acamptonectes and Gengasaurus were instead recovered outside of the Platypterygiinae in a clade also including Ophthalmosaurus. The results of this analysis are displayed in the cladogram below:

- Ophthalmosauridae
  - Baptanodon natans
  - - - Gengasaurus nicosiai
      - - Acamptonectes densus
        - Ophthalmosaurus icenicus
    - - - Aegirosaurus leptospondylus
        - - Mollesaurus periallus
          - Parrassaurus yacahuitztli
      - Platypterygiinae
        - Catutosaurus gaspariniae
        - - Jabalisaurus meztli
          - - - Undorosaurus nessovi
              - - - Undorosaurus? kielanae
                  - Undorosaurus? kristiansenae
                - - Undorosaurus gorodischensis
                  - Muiscasaurus catheti
            - - - Palvennia hoybergeti
                - - Janusaurus lundi
                  - - Arthropterygius chrisorum
                    - Arthropterygius thalassonotus
                    - Arthropterygius volgensis
                    - Keilhauia nui
              - - - Sumpalla argentina
                  - - Thalassodraco etchesi
                    - - Nannopterygius yasykovi
                      - - Nannopterygius enthekiodon
                        - Nannopterygius saveljeviensis
                - - Eternauta patagonica
                  - - Athabascasaurus bitumineus
                    - - Brachypterygius extremus
                      - - - Caypullisaurus bonapartei
                          - Leninia stellans
                        - - Sveltonectes insolitus
                          - - Myobradypterygius hauthali
                            - - - Acuetzpalin carranzai
                                - Grendelius alekseevi
                              - - - 'Platypterygius' americanus
                                  - 'Platypterygius' australis
                                - - - 'Platypterygius' elsuntuoso
                                    - - Sisteronia seeleyi
                                      - 'Platypterygius' hercynicus
                                  - - - 'Platypterygius' platydactylus
                                      - Kyhytysuka sachicarum
                                    - - Maiaspondylus lindoei
                                      - Simbirskiasaurus birjukovi
