= Plutoniosaurus =

Plutoniosaurus Temporal range: Early Cretaceous, ~135–130 Ma

Scientific classification
- Kingdom: Animalia
- Phylum: Chordata
- Order: †Ichthyosauria
- Family: †Ophthalmosauridae
- Subfamily: †Platypterygiinae
- Genus: †Plutoniosaurus; Efimov, 1997

Type species
- †Plutoniosaurus bedengensis Efimov, 1997

Synonyms
- Platypterygius bedengensis (Efimov, 1997)

Extinct genus of reptiles

Plutoniosaurus is an extinct genus of ophthalmosaurid ichthyosaur of uncertain validity from the Early Cretaceous (late Hauterivian) of the vicinity of Ulyanovsk, European Russia.

== Taxonomy ==
Plutoniosaurus was named by Vladimir Efimov in 1997 based on the holotype specimen UPM 2/740, a partial skeleton containing the skull, the shoulder girdle, forelimbs and vertebrae. The generic name is derived from the Ulyanovsk Regional Young Paleontologists Club that was nicknamed Plutonia. The specific name refers to the village of Novaya Beden'ga, the site of discovery on the right bank of the Volga.

In 1999, Maxim Arkhangel'skii synonymized the genus with Platypterygius, as did Michael Maisch and Andreas Matzke in 2000. While agreeing with the synonymy, Christopher McGowan and Ryosuke Motani considered P. bedengensis to be a nomen dubium within the genus in 2003, too poorly known to identify as a distinct species. In 2016, Valentin Fischer and colleagues considered the original description was too vague to confidently distinguish the genus and noted that the illustrations did not always match the written description. They thus regarded Plutoniosaurus bedengensis as a species inquirenda, while noting the possibility that it is the same species as the nearly coeval Simbirskiasaurus from the same region.

== Phylogeny ==
Zverkov and Efimov (2019) recovered Plutoniosaurus in a polytomy with the type species of Platypterygius and Leninia. The following cladogram shows a possible phylogenetic position of Plutoniosaurus in Ophthalmosauridae according to the analysis performed by Zverkov and Jacobs (2020).

- Ophthalmosauria
  - - Ophthalmosaurinae
      - - - - Acamptonectes densus
            - - Mollesaurus periallus
              - - Ophthalmosaurus natans
                - Ophthalmosaurus icenicus
      - - - Gengasaurus nicosiai
          - - - Nannopterygius yasykovi
              - - Nannopterygius enthekiodon
                - Nannopterygius saveljeviensis
                - Nannopterygius borealis
            - - - Arthropterygius volgensis
                - - Arthropterygius lundi
                  - Arthropterygius thalassonotus
                  - - Arthropterygius hoybergeti
                    - Arthropterygius chrisorum
    - Platypterygiinae
      - - Brachypterygius extremus
        - Aegirosaurus leptospondylus
        - - Muiscasaurus catheti
          - - Leninia stellans
            - - Sveltonectes insolitus
              - - Athabascasaurus bitumineus
                - - Platypterygius americanus
                  - - - Acuetzpalin carranzai
                      - Platypterygius sachicarum
                      - Caypullisaurus bonapartei
                    - - - - Grendelius mordax
                          - Grendelius alekseevi
                          - Grendelius pseudoscythicus
                          - Grendelius zhuravlevi
                        - - - - Undorosaurus kielanae
                              - - Undorosaurus nessovi
                                - Undorosaurus gorodischensis
                      - - Platypterygius australis
                        - - Plutoniosaurus bedengensis
                          - Simbirskiasaurus birjukovi
                          - Platypterygius hercynicus
                          - Sisteronia seeleyi
                          - Platypterygius platydactylus
                          - Maiaspondylus lindoei

== See also ==
- List of ichthyosaurs
- Timeline of ichthyosaur research
