= Leninia =

Leninia Temporal range: Early Cretaceous, 119–113 Ma

Scientific classification
- Kingdom: Animalia
- Phylum: Chordata
- Class: Reptilia
- Order: †Ichthyosauria
- Family: †Ophthalmosauridae
- Subfamily: †Ophthalmosaurinae
- Genus: †Leninia; Fischer et al., 2013

Type species
- †Leninia stellans Fischer et al., 2013

Extinct genus of reptiles

Leninia is an extinct genus of basal ophthalmosaurine ichthyosaur known from the late Early Cretaceous (lower Aptian stage) of western Russia. Leninia was first named by Valentin Fischer, Maxim S. Arkhangelsky, Gleb N. Uspensky, Ilya M. Stenshin and Pascal Godefroit in 2013 and the type species is Leninia stellans. It was named for Vladimir Lenin, one of the leaders of the Communist Revolution in Russia, but not directlу: the museum where fossils are housed is located within the Lenin Memorial and Lenin school complex in Ulyanovsk; accordingly, the generic name reflects the geohistorical location of the find.

The specimen was discovered in 2012, on the banks of the river Volga near the town of Kriushi in a limestone nodule. There are several other fossils from the same time period near it, including ammonites, lamellibranchs and fish remains. Only part of the skull was found.

== Features ==
The skull is incomplete, and without any teeth. it is partially crushed transversely, and nothing further forward than the naris remains, with what seems to be a fairly clean break. It is not known whether this was due to orogeny and rock action or to the ichthyosaur's death. The specimen is around 45 centimetres (18 in; 1.48 ft) long, which suggests the skull was between 65–90 centimetres (26–35 in; 2.13–2.95 ft) long overall.

Unusually, the posterior process of the maxilla extends as far back as the orbit, and about halfway along it, possibly even projecting into the orbit at points. The maxillary dental groove is extremely shallow, only 16 millimetres (0.63 in) deep. The lacrimal-nasal contact is elongated, so that the lacrimal, rather than the prefrontal, forms the posterior edge of the naris. The anterior process and shaft of the jugal are unusually narrow, but the posterior plate is well-developed and extends as high as the middle of the orbit.

The postorbital is small compared to the orbit, with a large dorsal orbital rim extending out from the top of the bone. The quadratojugal seems more robust than that of other ophthalmosaurines, but has a thin anterior surface which articulates with the postorbital. There is a concave area which a ligament would connect to the quadrate process.

The squamosal is present but incomplete. However, it is possible to tell the shape by the marks where it would have articulated with other bones. Above the naris, the nasal bone forms a conspicuous lateral 'wing'. There is no clear evidence for a foramen near the prefrontal-nasal facet.

The prefrontal forms a thick anterior process which has grown over the nasal, unlike in other ophthalmosaurids. Its suture with the lacrimal bone is straight. The frontals are roughly triangular and have the 'internasal' foramen between them (not between the nasals). They have long posterior processes which suture with the forked processes of the parietals in a star shape, hence the specific name stellans. The postfrontal contacts the nasal over a short distance, and as in Ophthalmosaurus, has no Y-shaped anterior process. Uniquely, the postfrontal does not border the supratemporal fenestra, but still forms a long process in contact with the supratemporal.

The parietals touch the anteriomedial process of the supratemporals, another autapomorphy. This anteromedial process also blocks the postfrontal from bordering the supratemporal fenestra. The parietals are crushed against one another, but there is no evidence of a crest.

The supratemporal is more extensive than in most ophthalmosaurines, but is separated from the postorbital by the postfrontal and squamosal bones. Both pterygoids are present but cannot really be seen, and are distorted.

The basioccipital is not perfectly preserved, but the extracondylar area is reduced and concave. The occipital condyle is bulbous, but the floor of the foramen magnum is not well preserved enough to be a diagnostic feature.

The occipital head of the stapes is largely expanded, with a large hyoid process, but the quadrate head is missing. The quadrate is roughly ear-shaped, with an occipital lamella.

Only the posterior end of the lower jaw is preserved, and this lacks any distinctive features, such as teeth. The surangular fossa is present but extremely reduced, and the angular is well exposed laterally. These features, however, are not diagnostic or autapomorphies.

Both scleral rings are preserved, but the left one is much less distorted. It is composed of 14 trapezoidal plates, with crenulations on the internal edge. The scleral aperture is only 11.03% of the orbital area, suggesting that the specimen was fully grown. (All of this section is citing)

== Evolutionary importance ==
Leninia is one of the latest-living ophthalmosaurines, and also one of the most basal. Despite this, it still had the very large scleral ring and aperture, suggesting that this was one of the most basal characteristics of ophthalmosaurines and that they were all deep-diving, remaining conservative in this ecological niche during the entire time period that they existed. The absolute size of Leninia's scleral ring is among the largest known in ichthyosaurs, with only Baptanodon ('Ophthalmosaurus natans') and the giant Temnodontosaurus exceeding it. As all the ophthalmosaurines had this kind of structure, and were more similar in eye structure than the platypterygines, this suggests that they did not diversify in the same way that the platypterygines did but stayed similar as deep divers, possibly as they were so specialised for deep diving that they were outcompeted in other niches.

== Phylogeny ==
Cladogram based in the phylogenetic analysis of Fischer et al., 2013:

- Thunnosauria
  - Ichthyosaurus communis
  - - Stenopterygius quadriscissus
    - - Chacaicosaurus cayi
      - Ophthalmosauridae
        - Arthropterygius chrisorum
        - *
          - Ophthalmosaurinae
            - Leninia stellans
            - Mollesaurus perialus
            - - Ophthalmosaurus icenicus (type species)
              - - Baptanodon ("O." natans)
                - Acamptonectes densus
          - Platypterygiinae
            - - Brachypterygius extremus
              - - Maiaspondylus lindoei
                - - Aegirosaurus leptospondylus
                  - Sveltonectes insolitus
            - - "Platypterygius" hercynicus
              - - Caypullisaurus bonapartei
                - - Athabascasaurus bitumineus
                  - "Platypterygius" australis

The following cladogram shows a possible phylogenetic position of Leninia in Ophthalmosauridae according to the analysis performed by Zverkov and Jacobs (2020).

- Ophthalmosauria
  - - Ophthalmosaurinae
      - - - - Acamptonectes densus
            - - Mollesaurus periallus
              - - Ophthalmosaurus natans
                - Ophthalmosaurus icenicus
      - - - Gengasaurus nicosiai
          - - - Nannopterygius yasykovi
              - - Nannopterygius enthekiodon
                - Nannopterygius saveljeviensis
                - Nannopterygius borealis
            - - - Arthropterygius volgensis
                - - Arthropterygius lundi
                  - Arthropterygius thalassonotus
                  - - Arthropterygius hoybergeti
                    - Arthropterygius chrisorum
    - Platypterygiinae
      - - Brachypterygius extremus
        - Aegirosaurus leptospondylus
        - - Muiscasaurus catheti
          - - Leninia stellans
            - - Sveltonectes insolitus
              - - Athabascasaurus bitumineus
                - - Platypterygius americanus
                  - - - Acuetzpalin carranzai
                      - Platypterygius sachicarum
                      - Caypullisaurus bonapartei
                    - - - - Grendelius mordax
                          - Grendelius alekseevi
                          - Grendelius pseudoscythicus
                          - Grendelius zhuravlevi
                        - - - - Undorosaurus kielanae
                              - - Undorosaurus nessovi
                                - Undorosaurus gorodischensis
                      - - Platypterygius australis
                        - - Plutoniosaurus bedengensis
                          - Simbirskiasaurus birjukovi
                          - Platypterygius hercynicus
                          - Sisteronia seeleyi
                          - Platypterygius platydactylus
                          - Maiaspondylus lindoei

== See also ==
- List of ichthyosaurs
- Timeline of ichthyosaur research
- List of organisms named after famous people (born 1800–1899)
