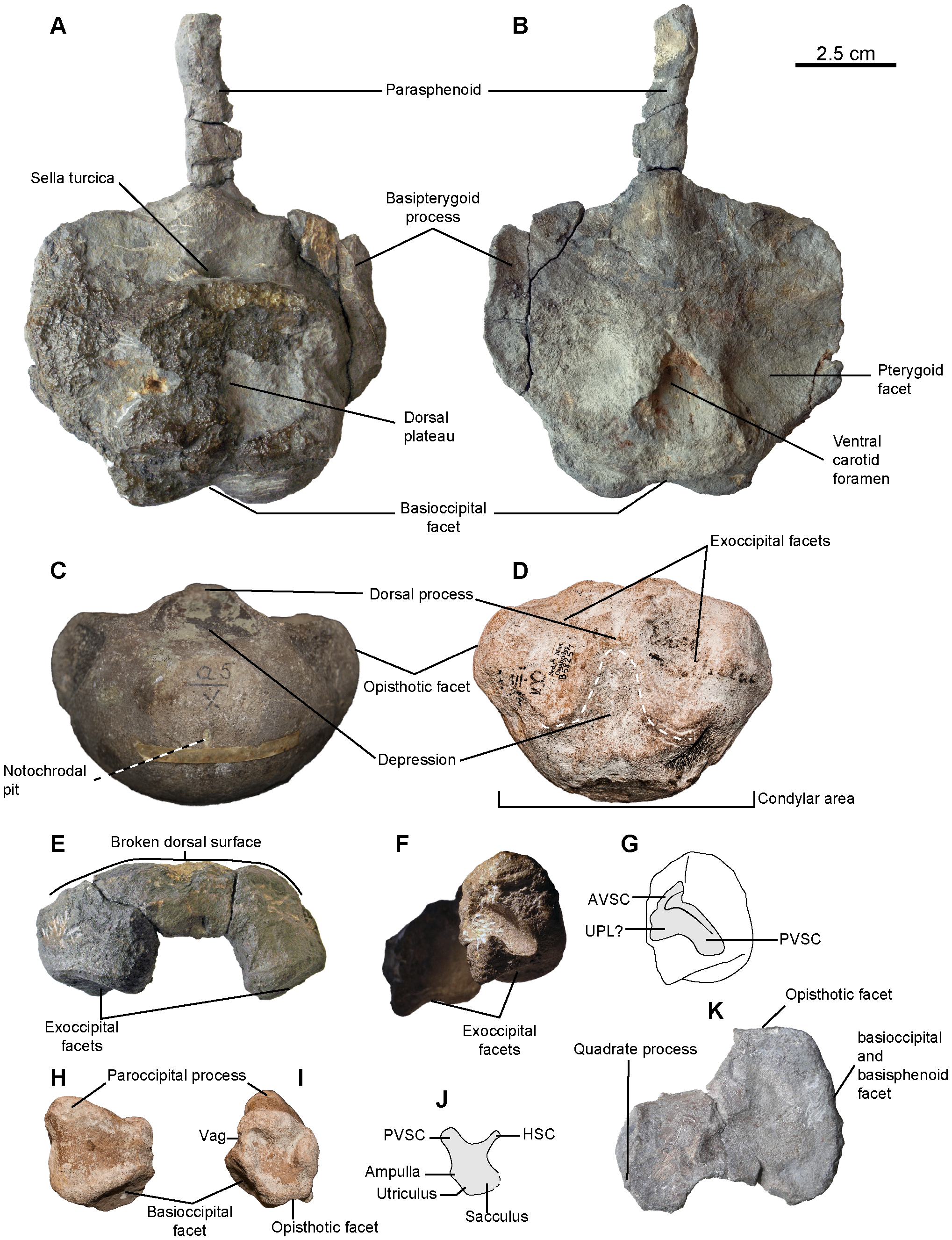
- Basicranium of the holotype

Scientific classification
- Kingdom: Animalia
- Phylum: Chordata
- Class: Reptilia
- Superorder: †Ichthyopterygia
- Order: †Ichthyosauria
- Family: †Ophthalmosauridae
- Subfamily: †Platypterygiinae
- Genus: †Sisteronia; Fischer et al., 2014

Type species
- †Sisteronia seeleyi Fischer et al., 2014

= Sisteronia =

Sisteronia Temporal range: Albian ~112–100 Ma

Extinct genus of reptiles

Sisteronia is an extinct genus of platypterygiine ophthalmosaurid ichthyosaur known from the 'middle' Cretaceous of southeastern England and southeastern France. It contains a single species, Sisteronia seeleyi.

== Discovery ==
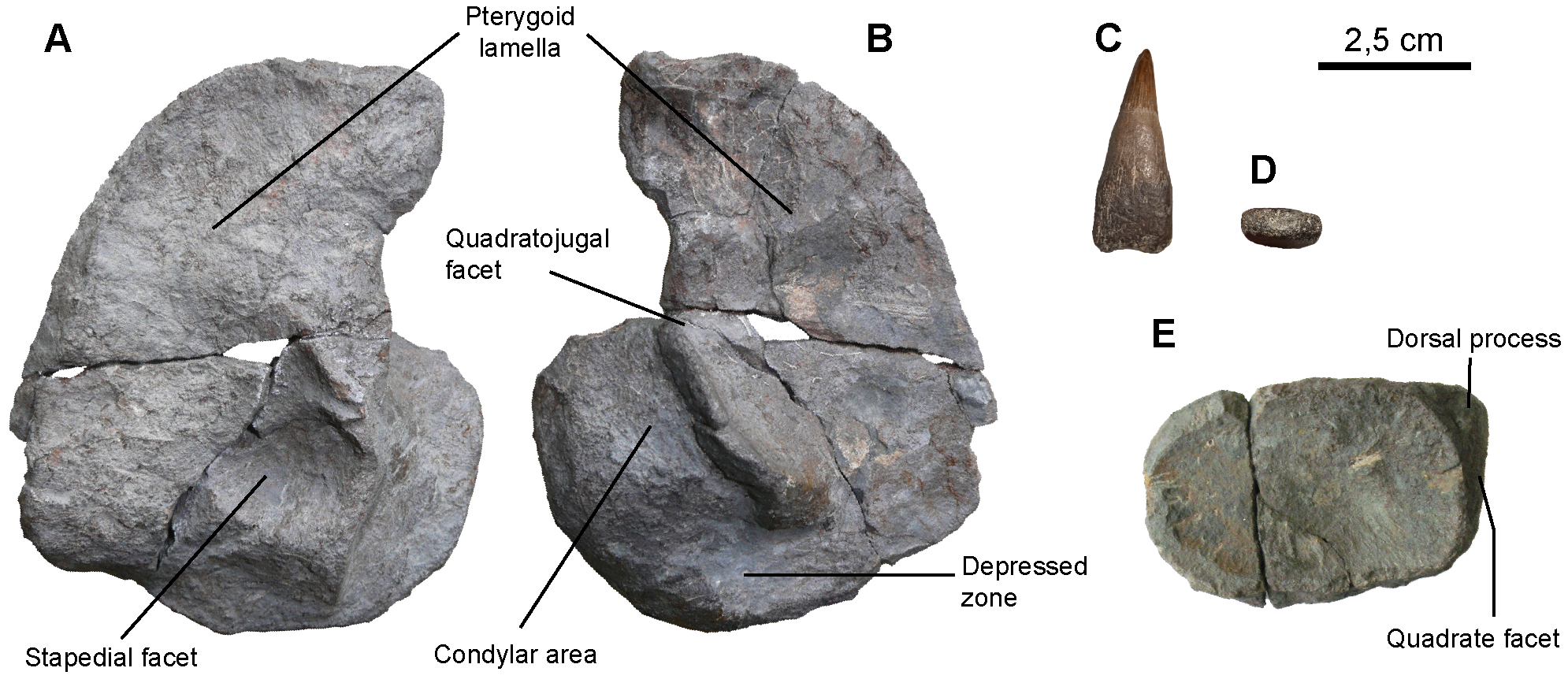
Quadrate, tooth and articular bone

Sisteronia was named by Valentin Fischer, Nathalie Bardet, Myette Guiomar and Pascal Godefroit in 2014 and the type species is Sisteronia seeleyi. The generic name honors Sisteron, a commune in the Alpes-de-Haute-Provence, southeastern France, where relatively complete specimens referable to Sisteronia were collected, including a partial articulated skeleton and at least three additional articulated specimens held in a private collection. The specific name, seeleyi, honors the renowned British paleontologist Harry Govier Seeley who cataloged thousands fragmentary ichthyosaur specimens from the Cambridge Greensand Member of the Lower Chalk Formation. Now housed in the collections of Sedgwick Museum of Earth Sciences (CAMSM), the Royal Belgian Institute of Natural Sciences (IRSNB), Hunterian Museum and Art Gallery (GLAHM), Leicester Museum & Art Gallery (LEICT) and Natural History Museum (NHMUK), most of these specimens have never been reassessed thoroughly since Seeley's publication in 1869, and include the holotype of Sisteronia.

Fischer et al. (2014) designated CAMSM B58257_67 as the holotype of Sisteronia. It is one of the most complete specimens from the Cambridge Greensand member, representing an incomplete, articulated skeleton, including a partial basicranium (the inferior portion of the skull), a scapula, a humerus, and five centra.

== Description ==
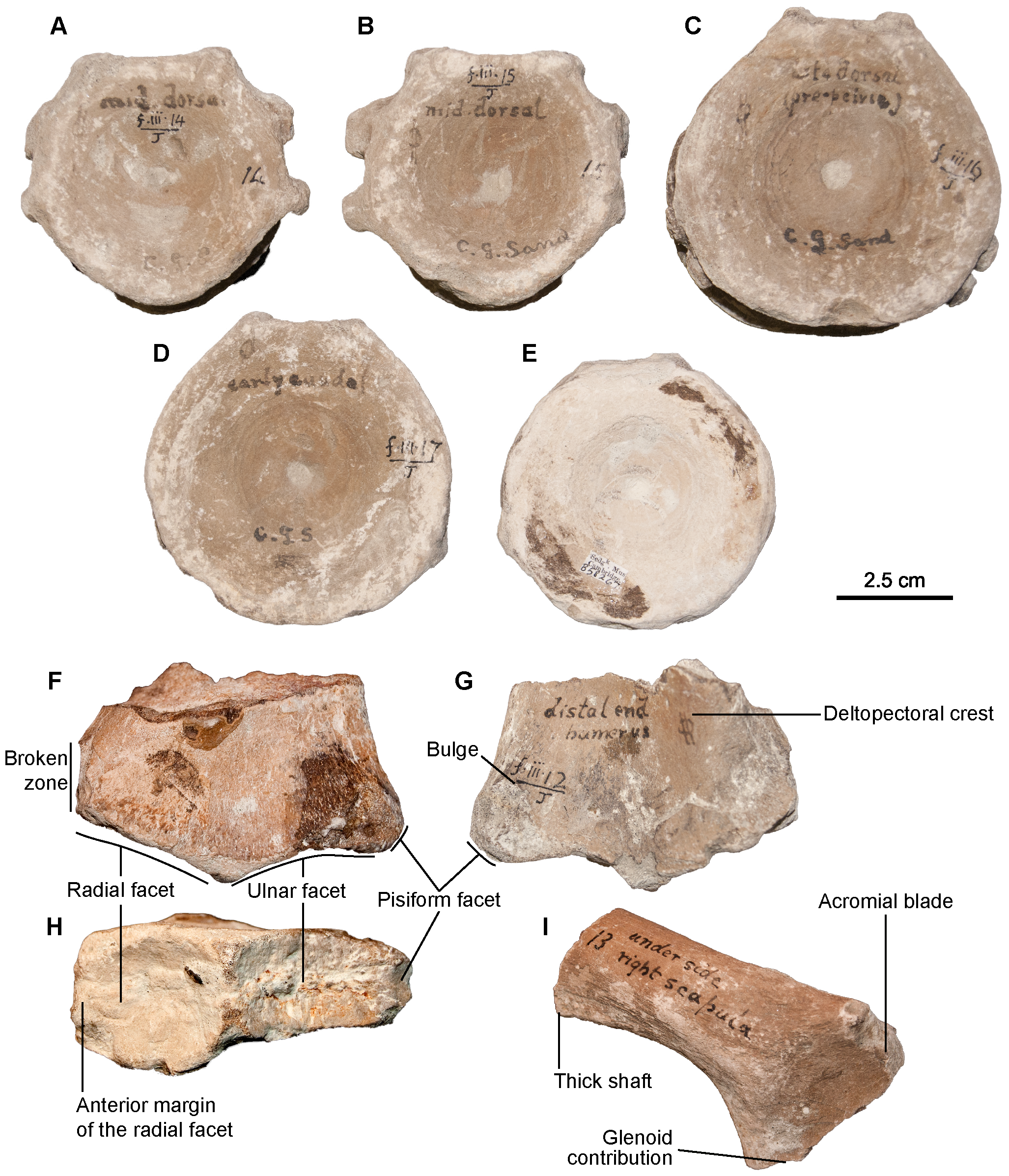
Axial and shoulder girdle elements of the holotype

Sisteronia possesses three autapomorphies, unique traits, that differentiate it from all other currently known platypterygiine ophthalmosaurids. In Sisteronia, the basioccipital possesses a raised process on the floor of foramen magnum. As observed only in a juvenile specimen of "Platypterygius" australis, the opisthotic lacks nearly completely a paroccipital process. Mature individuals of "P." australis lack this condition, unlike mature specimens of Sisteronia. The teeth of Sisteronia are rectangular in cross-section with small crown and root, the labiolingual length being usually equal to one half of the anteroposterior length. As suggested by its delicate, slender and unworn teeth, Sisteronia preyed on soft and small prey such as small fishes and neocoleoid cephalopods.

Sisteronia can be also distinguished from other platypterygiines by a combination of characters. Unlike Aegirosaurus and Sveltonectes insolitus, the anterior process of its maxilla is elongated anteriorly, reaching the level of the nasal bone. As in S. insolitus, Sisteronia has prominent opisthotic facets on the basioccipital, and an expanded sacculus impression on the opisthotic, as seen in Acamptonectes and mature individuals of "P." australis. Sisteronia possesses a U-shaped supraoccipital, like "P." australis, "P." hercynicus and "Ophthalmosaurus" natans, and an anteroposteriorly shortened quadrate condyle as also present in Ophthalmosaurus icenicus and S. insolitus. Finally, the humerus of Sisteronia has a facet for a posterior accessory element, as seen in "Ophthalmosaurus" monocharactus, "P." hercynicus, "P." americanus and "P." sp. from Texas and the Northwest Territories. Fischer et al. (2013) assigned Sisteronia to Platypterygiinae as it possesses several synapomorphies of this clade and lacks the synapomorphies of ophthalmosaurine ophthalmosaurids. A yet unpublished phylogenetic analysis reportedly supports this assignment.

== Phylogeny ==
A large phylogenetic analysis performed by Fischer (2013) in his unpublished thesis found Sisteronia to be a member of Platypterygiinae. Even though variants of this analysis have been formally published, the scorings of Sisteronia are based mainly on undescribed referred material currently held in a private collection, and therefore the publication of this cladogram is pending.

The following cladogram shows a possible phylogenetic position of Sisteronia in Platypterygiinae according to the analysis performed by Zverkov and Jacobs (2020).

- Ophthalmosauria
  - - Ophthalmosaurinae
      - - - - Acamptonectes densus
            - - Mollesaurus periallus
              - - Ophthalmosaurus natans
                - Ophthalmosaurus icenicus
      - - - Gengasaurus nicosiai
          - - - Nannopterygius yasykovi
              - - Nannopterygius enthekiodon
                - Nannopterygius saveljeviensis
                - Nannopterygius borealis
            - - - Arthropterygius volgensis
                - - Arthropterygius lundi
                  - Arthropterygius thalassonotus
                  - - Arthropterygius hoybergeti
                    - Arthropterygius chrisorum
    - Platypterygiinae
      - - Brachypterygius extremus
        - Aegirosaurus leptospondylus
        - - Muiscasaurus catheti
          - - Leninia stellans
            - - Sveltonectes insolitus
              - - Athabascasaurus bitumineus
                - - Platypterygius americanus
                  - - - Acuetzpalin carranzai
                      - Platypterygius sachicarum
                      - Caypullisaurus bonapartei
                    - - - - Grendelius mordax
                          - Grendelius alekseevi
                          - Grendelius pseudoscythicus
                          - Grendelius zhuravlevi
                        - - - - Undorosaurus kielanae
                              - - Undorosaurus nessovi
                                - Undorosaurus gorodischensis
                      - - Platypterygius australis
                        - - Plutoniosaurus bedengensis
                          - Simbirskiasaurus birjukovi
                          - Platypterygius hercynicus
                          - Sisteronia seeleyi
                          - Platypterygius platydactylus
                          - Maiaspondylus lindoei

== See also ==
- List of ichthyosaurs
- Timeline of ichthyosaur research
