= Muiscasaurus =

Muiscasaurus Temporal range: Barremian-Aptian ~130.0–112.6 Ma

Scientific classification
- Kingdom: Animalia
- Phylum: Chordata
- Class: Reptilia
- Superorder: †Ichthyopterygia
- Order: †Ichthyosauria
- Family: †Ophthalmosauridae
- Genus: †Muiscasaurus; Maxwell et al., 2015

Type species
- †Muiscasaurus catheti Maxwell et al., 2015

Extinct genus of reptiles

Muiscasaurus is an extinct genus of ophthalmosaurid ichthyosaur that lived in modern Colombia during the Early Cretaceous. The only known species is the type Muiscasaurus catheti.

== Discovery ==
The fossils of Muiscasaurus were found in the Paja Formation, whose sediments are exposed near the town of Villa de Leyva in Boyacá Department. These remains were found in 2010 in the middle of a limestone concretion, known as the Arcillolitas abigarradas Member, dating from the Barremian to Aptian epochs of the Lower Cretaceous. Although ammonites were found attached to the fossils, their poor preservation prevented identifying them and thereby establish the stratigraphy and precise age of the specimen. The fossil found, listed as the holotype specimen CIP-FCG-CBP-74, consists of a partial skull and some vertebrae with ribs that were found associated with the skull. These remains were designated in 2015 as the new genus and species Muiscasaurus catheti; the genus name being a reference to the Muisca of central Colombia, with the Latinized Greek word saurus, "reptile". The species name, catheti, means perpendicular and refers to the shape of the nostrils. The remains were prepared for the Centro de Investigaciones Paleontológicas (Paleontological Research Center) in Villa de Leyva.

== Description ==
The Muiscasaurus fossils corresponds to a juvenile individual, given the incomplete ossification of the vertebrae and the proportions of the skull. This lacks the front of the snout, as well as in the back of the skull, showing some crushing to the right side. The jaw elements are very thin and long, with some teeth preserved, which are relatively small. Muiscasaurus was a relatively large animal: the preserved skull length is 45 centimetres (18 in), and, depending on its exact proportions, could be between 48–65 centimetres (19–26 in) total cranial length. This individual could reach 3 metres (9 ft 10 in) long and up to 5 metres (16 ft 5 in) long in adults. Like all advanced ichthyosaurs, Muiscasaurus must had a compact and streamlined body, with a tail shaped like a half moon and all four legs transformed into flippers.

Muiscasaurus differs from its closest relatives by a combination of features: it had a very thin premaxilla, the nasal aperture is partially divided in two ovals for a spur-shaped nasal process, with the frontal portion in vertical position and the rear one horizontal; in other ophthalmosaurid ichthyosaurs, the aperture was fully open or fully separated into two. The posterior region was narrow and provided with a thin quadratojugal, the teeth were very thin and lacking of the thick enamel and the coarse striations, whereas in similar ichthyosaurs as Pervushovisaurus and Platypterygius had more robust teeth and grooves in the enamel.

== Phylogeny ==
Muiscasaurus was described based on fossils that were classified as belonging to the Ophthalmosauridae family, which includes most of the ichthyosaurs that lived during the Jurassic and Cretaceous periods. Muiscasaurus seems particularly occupied a very basal position within the family, with respect to the subgroup composed by Platypterygius, Caypullisaurus and Brachypterygius (although the latter two genera were slightly older than Muiscasaurus itself) .

Cladogram based in the phylogenetic analysis of Maxwell et al., 2015:

- Ophthalmosauridae
  - Ophthalmosaurus
  - Undorosaurus
  - Acamptonectes
  - - Leninia
    - - Aegirosaurus
      - - Mollesaurus
        - - - Muiscasaurus
            - - Brachypterygius
              - - Caypullisaurus
                - Platypterygius
                - - Platypterygius australis
                  - Simbirskiasaurus
                  - Pervushovisaurus
          - - Sveltonectes
            - Maiaspondylus
            - - Athabascasaurus
              - - Cryopterygius
                - - Janusaurus
                  - - Arthropterygius
                    - Palvennia

The following cladogram shows a possible phylogenetic position of Muiscasaurus in Ophthalmosauridae according to the analysis performed by Zverkov and Jacobs (2020).

- Ophthalmosauria
  - - Ophthalmosaurinae
      - - - - Acamptonectes densus
            - - Mollesaurus periallus
              - - Ophthalmosaurus natans
                - Ophthalmosaurus icenicus
      - - - Gengasaurus nicosiai
          - - - Nannopterygius yasykovi
              - - Nannopterygius enthekiodon
                - Nannopterygius saveljeviensis
                - Nannopterygius borealis
            - - - Arthropterygius volgensis
                - - Arthropterygius lundi
                  - Arthropterygius thalassonotus
                  - - Arthropterygius hoybergeti
                    - Arthropterygius chrisorum
    - Platypterygiinae
      - - Brachypterygius extremus
        - Aegirosaurus leptospondylus
        - - Muiscasaurus catheti
          - - Leninia stellans
            - - Sveltonectes insolitus
              - - Athabascasaurus bitumineus
                - - Platypterygius americanus
                  - - - Acuetzpalin carranzai
                      - Platypterygius sachicarum
                      - Caypullisaurus bonapartei
                    - - - - Grendelius mordax
                          - Grendelius alekseevi
                          - Grendelius pseudoscythicus
                          - Grendelius zhuravlevi
                        - - - - Undorosaurus kielanae
                              - - Undorosaurus nessovi
                                - Undorosaurus gorodischensis
                      - - Platypterygius australis
                        - - Plutoniosaurus bedengensis
                          - Simbirskiasaurus birjukovi
                          - Platypterygius hercynicus
                          - Sisteronia seeleyi
                          - Platypterygius platydactylus
                          - Maiaspondylus lindoei

== Paleobiology ==
In addition to Muiscasaurus, in the Paja Formation has been recovered other kind of ichthyosaur, Kyhytysuka sachicarum; it is distinguished of Muiscasaurus for their teeth and cranial features, including thicker, robust teeth with grooved tooth enamel. The analysis could indicate that while P. sachicarum probably had a generalist diet, Muiscasaurus was a much more specialized form, feeding on smaller and softer prey items. This would show that during the Cretaceous period in the neotropics, ichthyosaurs kept some ecological diversity.

== See also ==
- List of flora and fauna named after the Muisca
