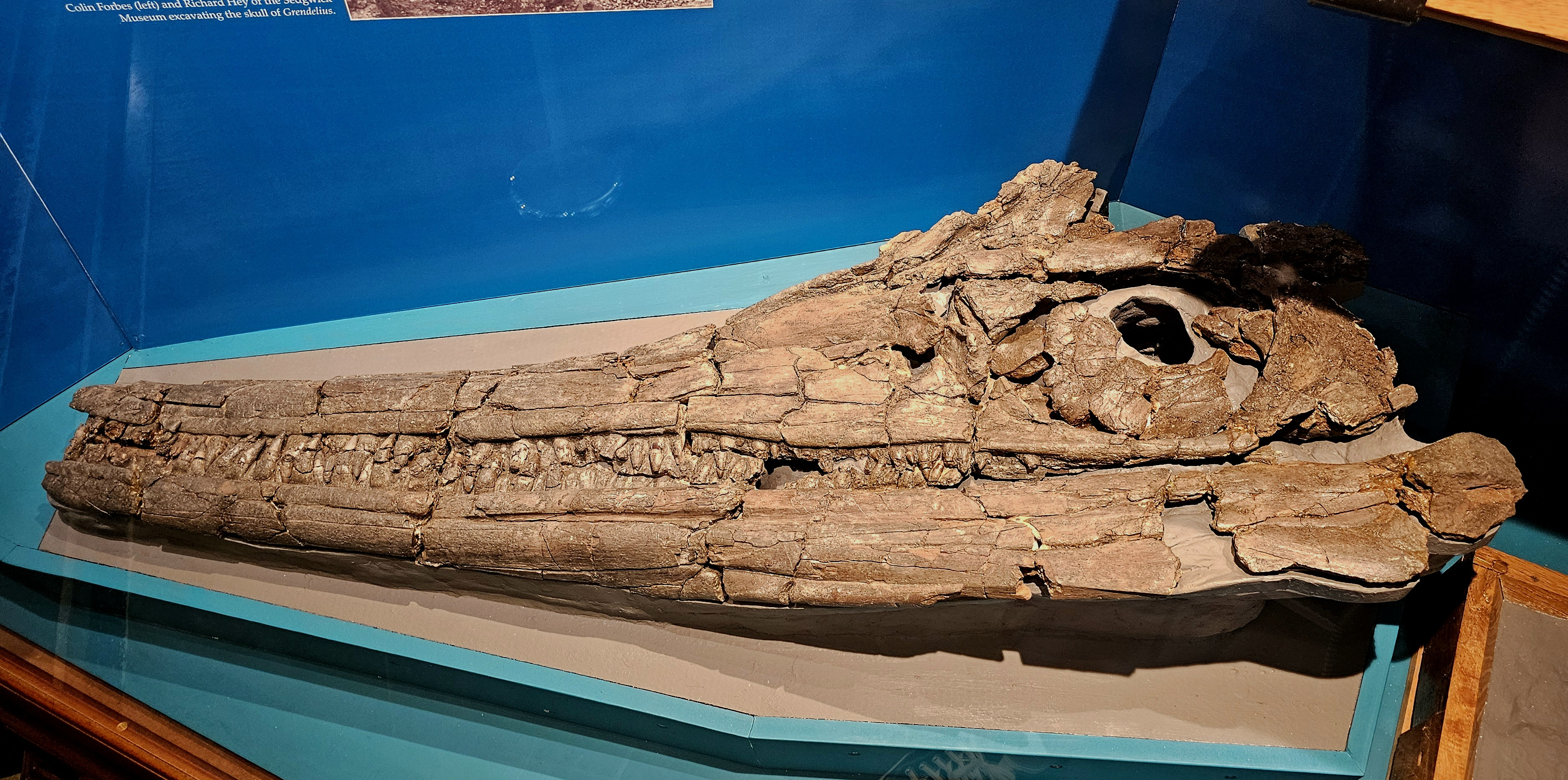
- Skull of G. mordax at the Sedgwick Museum in Cambridge

Scientific classification
- Domain: Eukaryota
- Kingdom: Animalia
- Phylum: Chordata
- Class: Reptilia
- Order: †Ichthyosauria
- Family: †Ophthalmosauridae
- Genus: †Grendelius; McGowan, 1976

Species
- †G. alekseevi (Arkangelsky, 2001) [originally Otschevia]; †G. mordax McGowan, 1976 (Type); †G. pseudoscythicus (Efimov, 1998) [originally Otschevia]; †G. zhuravlevi (Arkangelsky, 1998)

Synonyms
- Otschevia Efimov, 1998

= Grendelius =

Grendelius Temporal range: Late Jurassic, Kimmeridgian–Tithonian

Extinct genus of reptiles

Grendelius is a genus of platypterygiine ophthalmosaurid ichthyosaur from the Late Jurassic (Kimmeridgian-Tithonian) of the UK and European Russia. It was a medium-sized ichthyosaur measuring about 4 metres (13 ft) long.

== Taxonomy ==
Size comparison of G. alekseevi

The type species, Grendelius mordax, was described in 1976 on the basis of CAMSM J.68516, a complete skull with associated postcranial elements from the Kimmeridge Clay of England. Later, it was reassigned to Brachypterygius because differences between the two species were considered insufficient to warrant separate genera, or even species.

Efimov, 1998 named a new genus of ichthyosaur, Otschevia pseudoscythica on the basis of a single specimen (the holotype) from the Pseudoscythia Zone (late Tithonian stage of the Late Jurassic) of Ulyanovsk, Volga region, Russia. Later, Arkangelsky, 1998 described Brachypterygius zhuravlevi from a Tithonian-stage locality in Saratov, Russia, subsequently referring it to Otschevia zhuravlevi. Maisch & Matzke, 2000 considered both Russian taxa to be synonyms of each other, and referred the new combination B. pseudoscythicus to Brachypterygius. Thus, Grendelius and Otschevia are considered to be junior synonyms of Brachypterygius. Arkhangelsky named Otschevia alekseevi in 2001, also from the Late Jurassic of Russia. While McGowan and Motani (2003) considered these Russian taxa to be junior synonyms of B. extremus, Maisch (2010) retained them, and B. mordax, as separate species. A paper published in 2015 found Grendelius to be generically distinct from the Brachypterygius type species and more derived within Platypterygiinae, being more closely related to Platypterygius than to Brachypterygius. Otschevia was considered to be a junior synonym of Grendelius.

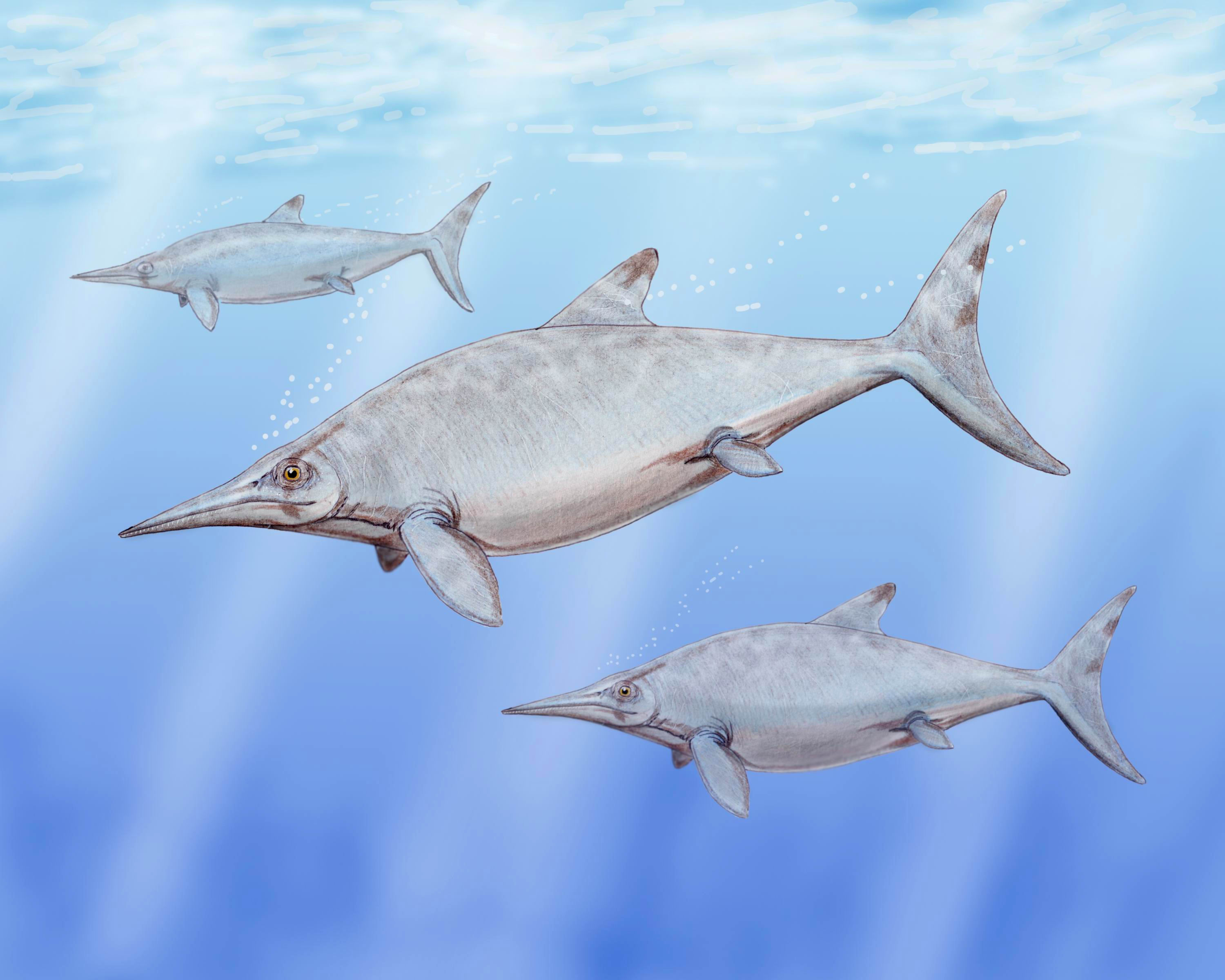
Life restoration of G. zhuravlevi

The following cladogram shows a possible phylogenetic position of Grendelius in Ophthalmosauridae according to the analysis performed by Zverkov and Jacobs (2020).

- Ophthalmosauria
  - - Ophthalmosaurinae
      - - - - Acamptonectes densus
            - - Mollesaurus periallus
              - - Ophthalmosaurus natans
                - Ophthalmosaurus icenicus
      - - - Gengasaurus nicosiai
          - - - Nannopterygius yasykovi
              - - Nannopterygius enthekiodon
                - Nannopterygius saveljeviensis
                - Nannopterygius borealis
            - - - Arthropterygius volgensis
                - - Arthropterygius lundi
                  - Arthropterygius thalassonotus
                  - - Arthropterygius hoybergeti
                    - Arthropterygius chrisorum
    - Platypterygiinae
      - - Brachypterygius extremus
        - Aegirosaurus leptospondylus
        - - Muiscasaurus catheti
          - - Leninia stellans
            - - Sveltonectes insolitus
              - - Athabascasaurus bitumineus
                - - Platypterygius americanus
                  - - - Acuetzpalin carranzai
                      - Platypterygius sachicarum
                      - Caypullisaurus bonapartei
                    - - - - Grendelius mordax
                          - Grendelius alekseevi
                          - Grendelius pseudoscythicus
                          - Grendelius zhuravlevi
                        - - - - Undorosaurus kielanae
                              - - Undorosaurus nessovi
                                - Undorosaurus gorodischensis
                      - - Platypterygius australis
                        - - Plutoniosaurus bedengensis
                          - Simbirskiasaurus birjukovi
                          - Platypterygius hercynicus
                          - Sisteronia seeleyi
                          - Platypterygius platydactylus
                          - Maiaspondylus lindoei

== See also ==
- List of ichthyosaurs
- Timeline of ichthyosaur research
