= Undorosaurus =

Undorosaurus Temporal range: Late Jurassic, 150.8–145.5 Ma
- Reconstructed skeleton of U. gorodischensis

Scientific classification
- Kingdom: Animalia
- Phylum: Chordata
- Class: Reptilia
- Superorder: †Ichthyopterygia
- Order: †Ichthyosauria
- Family: †Ophthalmosauridae
- Subfamily: †Platypterygiinae
- Genus: †Undorosaurus; Efimov, 1999

Type species
- †Undorosaurus gorodischensis (Efimov, 1999)

Other species
- †U. nessovi Efimov, 1999; †U. trautscholdi Arkhangelsky & Zverkov, 2014; †U. kielanae Zverkov & Efimov, 2019

Synonyms
- Cryopterygius kielanae Tyborowski, 2016; Cryopterygius kristiansenae? Druckenmiller et al., 2012; Ophthalmosaurus gorodischensis Maisch & Matzke, 2000

Extinct genus of reptiles

Undorosaurus is an extinct genus of ophthalmosaurid ichthyosaur known from western Russia, Svalbard, and Poland. It was a large ichthyosaur, with the type species measuring 4–6 metres (13–20 ft) long.

== Discovery and naming ==
Skull bones of U. kielanae

Undorosaurus was named by Vladimir M. Efimov in 1999 and the type species is Undorosaurus gorodischensis. The specific name is named after Gorodischi, the type locality of this taxon. U. trautscholdi is named in honor of the geologist Hermann Trautschold who collected and made the first description of the fossils of the holotype of the species.

Undorosaurus was first known from the holotype UPM EP-II-20 (527), a partial three-dimensionally preserved skeleton which preserved partial skull. It was collected near the Volga river at Gorodischi from the Epivirgatites nikitini ammonoid zone, dating to the Late Jurassic.

A second species, U. trautscholdi, was discovered in 1878 by Hermann Trautschold and was described by M.S. Arkhangelsky and N.G. Zverkov in 2014 from a partial left forefin found in the locality of Mnyovniki (Mnevniki), Moscow Oblast.

The holotype (specimen GMUL UŁ no. 3579-81) of the third species, U. kielanae, was discovered in the Kcynia Formation of the Owadów-Brzezinki Quarry, Poland, and it was first described by Daniel Tyborowski in 2016 as Cryopterygius kielanae. C. kielanae was moved to Undorosaurus by Zverkov & Efimov (2019).

== Classification ==
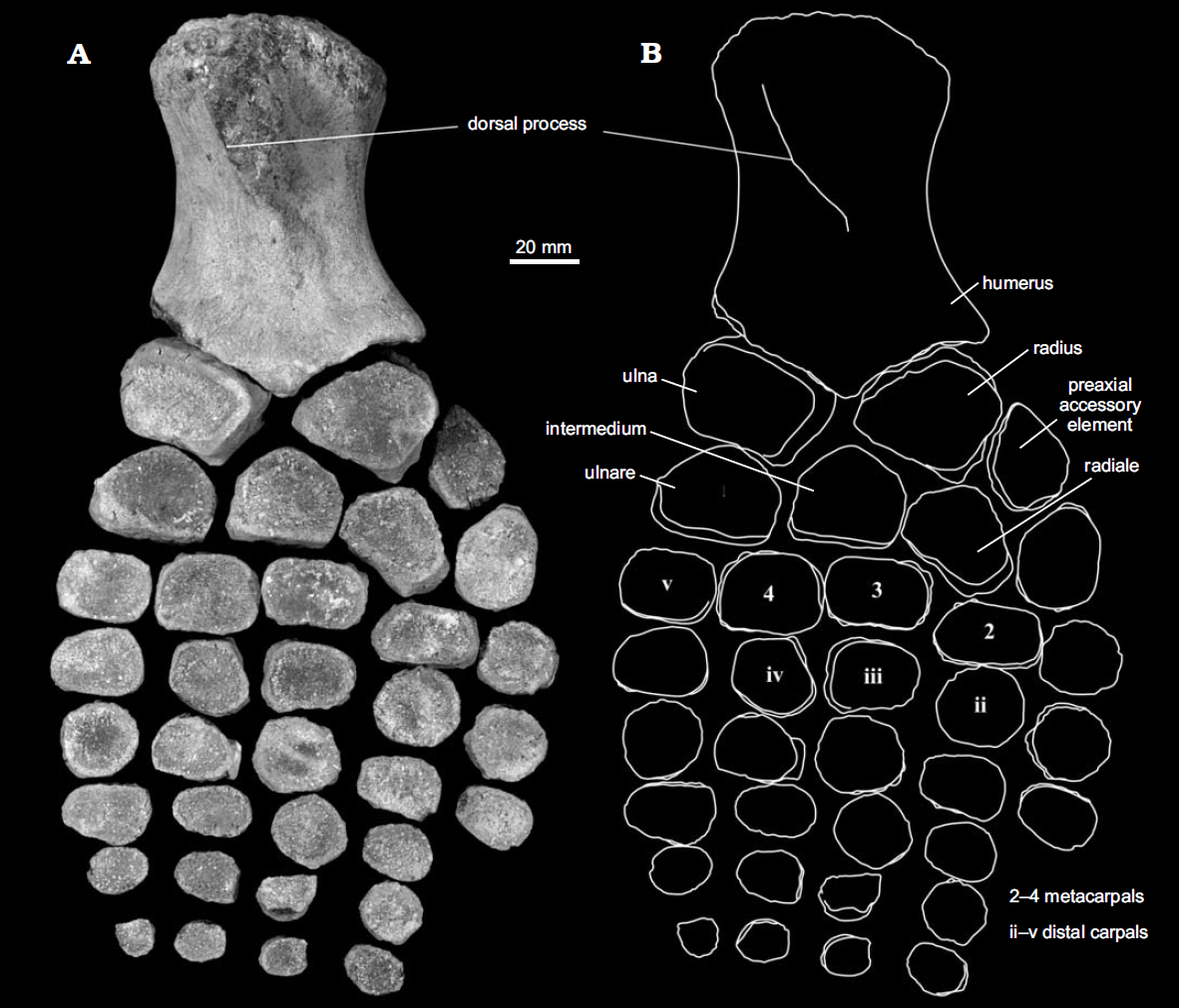
Forefin of U. kielanae

Maisch and Matzke (2000) regarded Undorosaurus to be a species of Ophthalmosaurus. However, Storrs et al. 2000 rejected this synonymy based on the tooth morphology of the specimen. Chris McGowan and Ryosuke Motani (2003) pointed out two noteworthy differences to Ophthalmosaurus, an incompletely fused ischiopubis and a remarkably strong dentition, and considered Undorosaurus to be a valid genus of ophthalmosaurid. Undorosaurus's validity is now accepted by most authors, even by Maisch (2010) who originally proposed the synonymy.

Zverkov & Efimov (2019) considered the genus Cryopterygius to be a junior synonym of the genus Undorosaurus. The authors considered the type species of the former genus, C. kristiansenae, to be synonymous with Undorosaurus gorodischensis; second species of Cryopterygius, C. kielanae, was tentatively maintained by the authors as a distinct species within the genus Undorosaurus.

=== Phylogeny ===
The following cladogram shows a possible phylogenetic position of Undorosaurus in Ophthalmosauridae according to the analysis performed by Zverkov and Jacobs (2020).

- Ophthalmosauria
  - - Ophthalmosaurinae
      - - - - Acamptonectes densus
            - - Mollesaurus periallus
              - - Ophthalmosaurus natans
                - Ophthalmosaurus icenicus
      - - - Gengasaurus nicosiai
          - - - Nannopterygius yasykovi
              - - Nannopterygius enthekiodon
                - Nannopterygius saveljeviensis
                - Nannopterygius borealis
            - - - Arthropterygius volgensis
                - - Arthropterygius lundi
                  - Arthropterygius thalassonotus
                  - - Arthropterygius hoybergeti
                    - Arthropterygius chrisorum
    - Platypterygiinae
      - - Brachypterygius extremus
        - Aegirosaurus leptospondylus
        - - Muiscasaurus catheti
          - - Leninia stellans
            - - Sveltonectes insolitus
              - - Athabascasaurus bitumineus
                - - Platypterygius americanus
                  - - - Acuetzpalin carranzai
                      - Platypterygius sachicarum
                      - Caypullisaurus bonapartei
                    - - - - Grendelius mordax
                          - Grendelius alekseevi
                          - Grendelius pseudoscythicus
                          - Grendelius zhuravlevi
                        - - - - Undorosaurus kielanae
                              - - Undorosaurus nessovi
                                - Undorosaurus gorodischensis
                      - - Platypterygius australis
                        - - Plutoniosaurus bedengensis
                          - Simbirskiasaurus birjukovi
                          - Platypterygius hercynicus
                          - Sisteronia seeleyi
                          - Platypterygius platydactylus
                          - Maiaspondylus lindoei

=== Cryopterygius ===
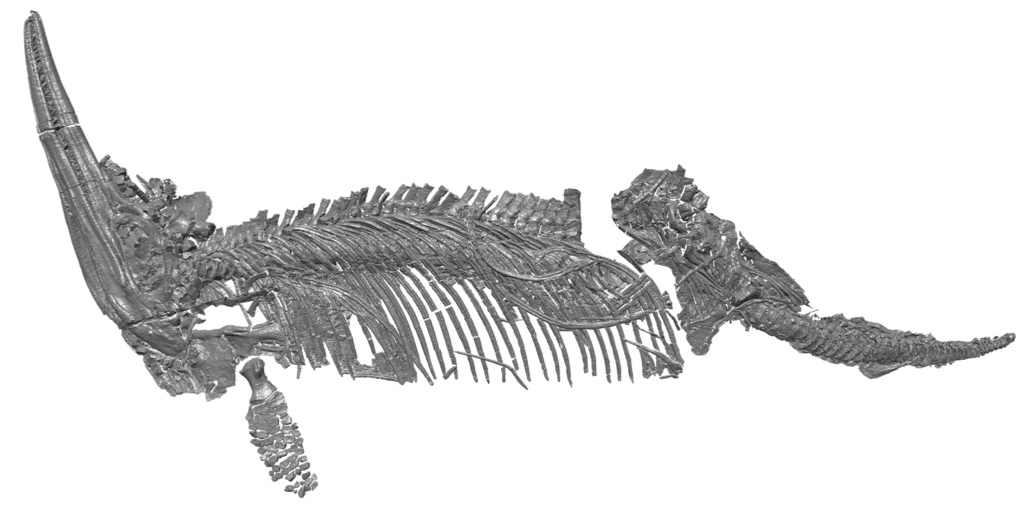
Holotype of C. kristiansenae

Cryopterygius (meaning 'frozen fin' in Greek) is a dubious extinct genus of ophthalmosaurid ichthyosaur known from the Agardhfjellet Formation of Norway. One species was recognised: C. kristiansenae.

The holotype, PMO 214.578, consists of a single, but largely complete specimen from the Slottsmøya Member of the Agardhfjellet Formation that was excavated between 2004 and 2012. Druckenmiller et al. (2012) subsequently named and described C. kristiansenae on the basis of this specimen. It has been suggested that C. kristiansenae may also be synonymous with Undorosaurus.

A second species, C. kielanae, was found in the Kcynia Formation from the Late Jurassic of Poland. It has since been synonymised with Undorosaurus and was found to be a species of Undorosaurus (U. kielanae).

== See also ==
- List of ichthyosaurs
- Timeline of ichthyosaur research
