= Acuetzpalin =

Acuetzpalin Temporal range: Late Jurassic, Kimmeridgian

Scientific classification
- Kingdom: Animalia
- Phylum: Chordata
- Class: Reptilia
- Order: †Ichthyosauria
- Family: †Ophthalmosauridae
- Subfamily: †Platypterygiinae
- Genus: †Acuetzpalin; Barrientos-Lara & Alvarado-Ortega, 2020

Type species
- †Acuetzpalin carranzai Barrientos-Lara & Alvarado-Ortega, 2020

Extinct genus of reptiles

Acuetzpalin (meaning "water lizard" in Classical Nahuatl) is an extinct genus of platypterygiine ophthalmosaurid ichthyosaur found in the Kimmeridgian La Casita Formation in Mexico. It is known from a partial skeleton (missing the limbs), of which the skull is surprisingly well preserved. Its length is estimated to have been more than 3.1 metres (10 ft) long, considering the missing parts of the holotype. It was the first ichthyosaur described in 2020 and the first new ichthyosaur genus described since 2017 (both Gengasaurus and Keilhauia were described in 2017).

== Classification ==
A phylogenetic analysis conducted in 2020 reveals that Acuetzpalin is a member of the subfamily Platypterygiinae and is located among the most-derived platypterygiines.

=== Phylogeny ===
The following cladogram shows the possible phylogenetic position of Acuetzpalin in Ophthalmosauridae according to the analysis performed by Zverkov and Jacobs (2020).

- Ophthalmosauria
  - - Ophthalmosaurinae
      - - - - Acamptonectes densus
            - - Mollesaurus periallus
              - - Ophthalmosaurus natans
                - Ophthalmosaurus icenicus
      - - - Gengasaurus nicosiai
          - - - Nannopterygius yasykovi
              - - Nannopterygius enthekiodon
                - Nannopterygius saveljeviensis
                - Nannopterygius borealis
            - - - Arthropterygius volgensis
                - - Arthropterygius lundi
                  - Arthropterygius thalassonotus
                  - - Arthropterygius hoybergeti
                    - Arthropterygius chrisorum
    - Platypterygiinae
      - - Brachypterygius extremus
        - Aegirosaurus leptospondylus
        - - Muiscasaurus catheti
          - - Leninia stellans
            - - Sveltonectes insolitus
              - - Athabascasaurus bitumineus
                - - Platypterygius americanus
                  - - - Acuetzpalin carranzai
                      - Platypterygius sachicarum
                      - Caypullisaurus bonapartei
                    - - - - Grendelius mordax
                          - Grendelius alekseevi
                          - Grendelius pseudoscythicus
                          - Grendelius zhuravlevi
                        - - - - Undorosaurus kielanae
                              - - Undorosaurus nessovi
                                - Undorosaurus gorodischensis
                      - - Platypterygius australis
                        - - Plutoniosaurus bedengensis
                          - Simbirskiasaurus birjukovi
                          - Platypterygius hercynicus
                          - Sisteronia seeleyi
                          - Platypterygius platydactylus
                          - Maiaspondylus lindoei
