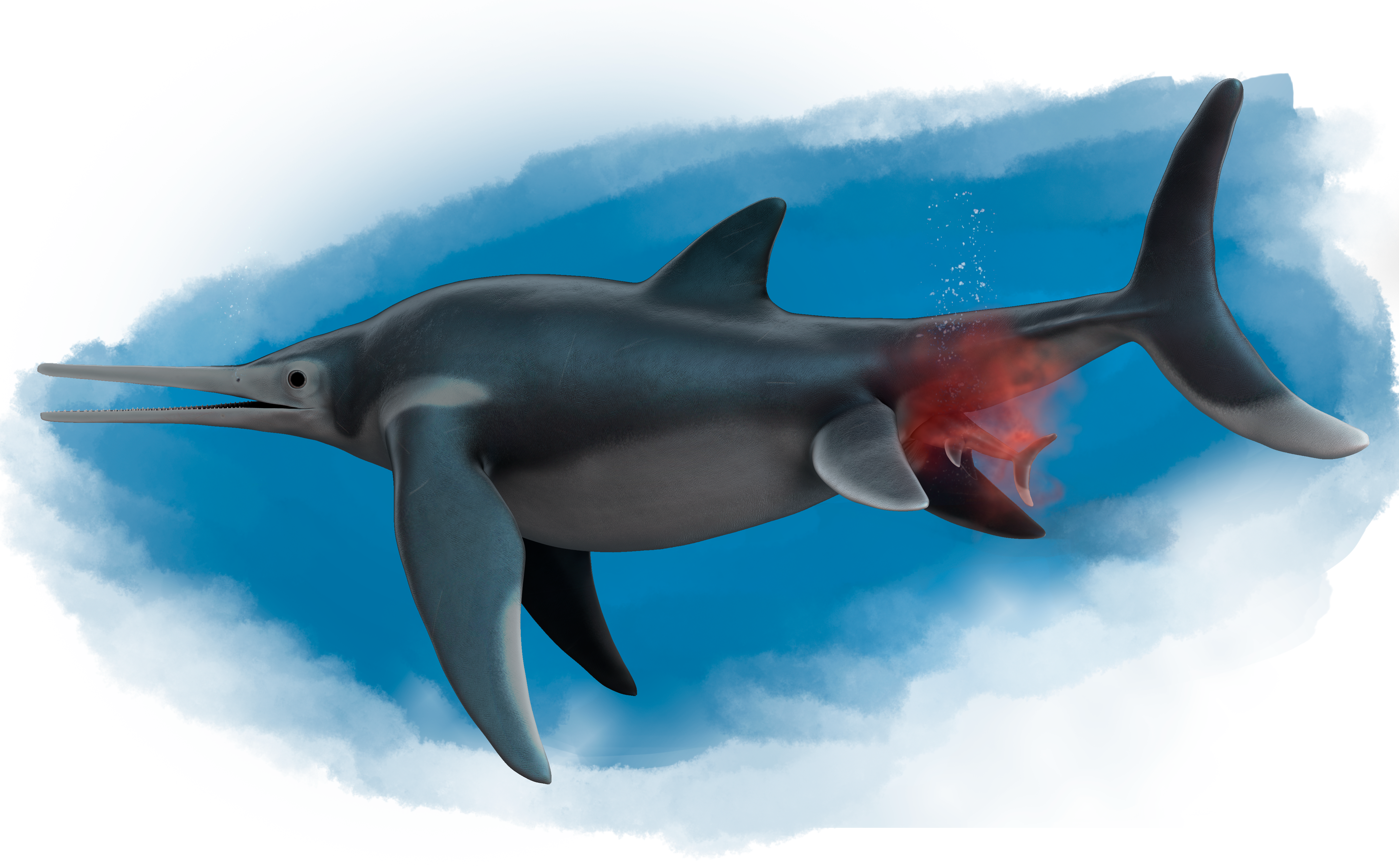
- Life restoration of M. lindoei giving birth

Scientific classification
- Kingdom: Animalia
- Phylum: Chordata
- Class: Reptilia
- Order: †Ichthyosauria
- Family: †Ophthalmosauridae
- Subfamily: †Platypterygiinae
- Genus: †Maiaspondylus; Maxwell & Caldwell, 2006

Species
- †Maiaspondylus cantabrigiensis Zverkov & Grigoriev, 2020; †Maiaspondylus lindoei Maxwell & Caldwell, 2006

Synonyms
- "Ophthalmosaurus" cantabrigiensis Lydekker, 1888; "Platypterygius" ochevi Arkhangel'sky et al. 2008

= Maiaspondylus =

Maiaspondylus Temporal range: Early-Late Cretaceous, 113–94.3 Ma

Extinct genus of reptiles

Maiaspondylus is an extinct genus of platypterygiine ophthalmosaurid ichthyosaurs known from Northwest Territories of Canada, the Cambridge Greensand of England and the Voronezh Region of Russia.

== Description ==
Maiaspondylus is known from the holotype UALVP 45635, a disarticulated but nearly complete skeleton preserved in three dimensions and from the referred materials UALVP 45639, two articulated, partially preserved embryos and eight articulated vertebrae of an adult, UALVP 45640, 14 articulated vertebrae of a juvenile, UALVP 45640, 12 articulated vertebrae, UALVP 45642, a partial snout and left dentaries with teeth and UALVP 45643, a fragmentary snout. All specimens were collected at Hay River from the Loon River Formation, dating to the early Albian age of the Early Cretaceous, about 110 million years ago.

All Maiaspondylus specimens were originally referred to Platypterygius. However, all recent cladistic analyses found that Maiaspondylus is a valid genus of ophthalmosaurid. Patrick S. Druckenmiller and Erin E. Maxwell (2010) found it to be most closely related to "Platypterygius" americanus, which probably do not belong to the genus Platypterygius.

== Etymology ==
Maiaspondylus was named by Erin E. Maxwell and Michael W. Caldwell in 2006 and the type species is Maiaspondylus lindoei. The generic name is derived from maia (μαία), Greek for "caring mother" and spondylos (σπόνδυλος), Greek for "vertebra". The generic name named in reference to the unique specimen, UALVP 45639, that composed of two embryos agglutinated to eight articulated vertebrae of an adult (within its body cavity), presumably the mother. Maxwell and Caldwell (2003) suggested that this specimen proves that Maiaspondylus was viviparous, giving live birth. These embryos are the geologically youngest and the physically smallest known ichthyosaur embryos. The specific name honors the Geology Museum of the University of Alberta technician Allan Lindoe for discovering, collecting and preparating the specimens.

A study on the anatomy and phylogenetic relationships of Maiaspondylus lindoei, "Ophthalmosaurus" cantabrigiensis and "Platypterygius" ochevi was published by Zverkov & Grigoriev (2020), who transfer "O". cantabrigiensis to the genus Maiaspondylus, and consider "P". ochevi to be a junior synonym of M. cantabrigiensis.

== Phylogeny ==
The following cladogram shows a possible phylogenetic position of Maiaspondylus in Ophthalmosauridae according to the analysis performed by Zverkov and Jacobs (2020).

- Ophthalmosauria
  - - Ophthalmosaurinae
      - - - - Acamptonectes densus
            - - Mollesaurus periallus
              - - Ophthalmosaurus natans
                - Ophthalmosaurus icenicus
      - - - Gengasaurus nicosiai
          - - - Nannopterygius yasykovi
              - - Nannopterygius enthekiodon
                - Nannopterygius saveljeviensis
                - Nannopterygius borealis
            - - - Arthropterygius volgensis
                - - Arthropterygius lundi
                  - Arthropterygius thalassonotus
                  - - Arthropterygius hoybergeti
                    - Arthropterygius chrisorum
    - Platypterygiinae
      - - Brachypterygius extremus
        - Aegirosaurus leptospondylus
        - - Muiscasaurus catheti
          - - Leninia stellans
            - - Sveltonectes insolitus
              - - Athabascasaurus bitumineus
                - - Platypterygius americanus
                  - - - Acuetzpalin carranzai
                      - Platypterygius sachicarum
                      - Caypullisaurus bonapartei
                    - - - - Grendelius mordax
                          - Grendelius alekseevi
                          - Grendelius pseudoscythicus
                          - Grendelius zhuravlevi
                        - - - - Undorosaurus kielanae
                              - - Undorosaurus nessovi
                                - Undorosaurus gorodischensis
                      - - Platypterygius australis
                        - - Plutoniosaurus bedengensis
                          - Simbirskiasaurus birjukovi
                          - Platypterygius hercynicus
                          - Sisteronia seeleyi
                          - Platypterygius platydactylus
                          - Maiaspondylus lindoei

== See also ==
- List of ichthyosaurs
- Timeline of ichthyosaur research
