= Gengasaurus =

Gengasaurus Temporal range: Late Jurassic, 152 Ma

Scientific classification
- Kingdom: Animalia
- Phylum: Chordata
- Class: Reptilia
- Order: †Ichthyosauria
- Family: †Ophthalmosauridae
- Subfamily: †Ophthalmosaurinae
- Genus: †Gengasaurus; Paparella et al., 2017
- Species: †G. nicosiai

Binomial name
- †Gengasaurus nicosiai Paparella et al., 2017

Extinct genus of reptiles

Gengasaurus is an extinct genus of ophthalmosaurid ichthyosaur from the Jurassic. The type and only species, Gengasaurus nicosiai, was named in 2017, after the locality of Genga, Marche. It lived in Italy about 152 million years ago.

== History ==
The near complete holotype was discovered in 1976 in the Late Jurassic (Tithonian) Calcari ad aptici e Saccocoma Formation at Camponocecchio and it was described in 1980 and 2000 as the "Genga ichthyosaur" before it was named and described in 2016 - this paper was eventually published in 2017. The holotype is now housed at the Spaelaeo-Palaeontologic Museum in Genga.

== Phylogeny ==
The following cladogram shows a possible phylogenetic position of Gengasaurus in Ophthalmosauridae according to the analysis performed by Zverkov and Jacobs (2020).

- Ophthalmosauria
  - - Ophthalmosaurinae
      - - - - Acamptonectes densus
            - - Mollesaurus periallus
              - - Ophthalmosaurus natans
                - Ophthalmosaurus icenicus
      - - - Gengasaurus nicosiai
          - - - Nannopterygius yasykovi
              - - Nannopterygius enthekiodon
                - Nannopterygius saveljeviensis
                - Nannopterygius borealis
            - - - Arthropterygius volgensis
                - - Arthropterygius lundi
                  - Arthropterygius thalassonotus
                  - - Arthropterygius hoybergeti
                    - Arthropterygius chrisorum
    - Platypterygiinae
      - - Brachypterygius extremus
        - Aegirosaurus leptospondylus
        - - Muiscasaurus catheti
          - - Leninia stellans
            - - Sveltonectes insolitus
              - - Athabascasaurus bitumineus
                - - Platypterygius americanus
                  - - - Acuetzpalin carranzai
                      - Platypterygius sachicarum
                      - Caypullisaurus bonapartei
                    - - - - Grendelius mordax
                          - Grendelius alekseevi
                          - Grendelius pseudoscythicus
                          - Grendelius zhuravlevi
                        - - - - Undorosaurus kielanae
                              - - Undorosaurus nessovi
                                - Undorosaurus gorodischensis
                      - - Platypterygius australis
                        - - Plutoniosaurus bedengensis
                          - Simbirskiasaurus birjukovi
                          - Platypterygius hercynicus
                          - Sisteronia seeleyi
                          - Platypterygius platydactylus
                          - Maiaspondylus lindoei
