= Simbirskiasaurus =

Simbirskiasaurus Temporal range: Early Cretaceous, 130 Ma

Scientific classification
- Kingdom: Animalia
- Phylum: Chordata
- Class: Reptilia
- Order: †Ichthyosauria
- Family: †Ophthalmosauridae
- Subfamily: †Platypterygiinae
- Genus: †Simbirskiasaurus; Otschev and Efimov, 1985

Species
- S. birjukovi Otschev and Efimov, 1985 (Type)

Extinct genus of reptiles

Simbirskiasaurus is an extinct genus of ichthyosaur from the Early Cretaceous (early Barremian) of Ulyanovsk Oblast, Russia. Its type specimen is YKM 65119, a fragmentary skull and vertebral column.

== Description ==
Fischer et al. give the diagnosis of Simbirskiasaurus as follows: "Platypterygiine ophthalmosaurid characterized by the following autapomorphies: external naris divided by a nasomaxillary pillar; posterior opening of the narial complex with anteroposteriorly constricted dorsal extension; deeply interdigitating prefrontal–lacrimal suture [reminiscent of the basal neoichthyosaurian Temnodontosaurus platyodon (Conybeare, 1822); see Godefroit, 1993]. Simbirskiasaurus birjukovi is also characterized by the following unique combination of features: subnarial process of the premaxilla reaches the posterior margin of the external naris (shared with Cryopterygius kristiansenae Druckenmiller et al., 2012); elongated anterior process of the maxilla, reaching anteriorly the level of the nasal [unlike in Aegirosaurus leptospondylus Bardet & Fernández, 2000 and Sveltonectes insolitus (Fischer et al., 2011b)]; pres- ence of a supranarial process of the premaxilla [shared with Platypterygius australis (McCoy, 1867), see Kear, 2005, and possibly Pervushovisaurus bannovkensis (Arkhangelsky, 1998b)]."

== Phylogeny ==
The following cladogram shows a possible phylogenetic position of Simbirskiasaurus in Ophthalmosauridae according to the analysis performed by Zverkov and Jacobs (2020).

- Ophthalmosauria
  - - Ophthalmosaurinae
      - - - - Acamptonectes densus
            - - Mollesaurus periallus
              - - Ophthalmosaurus natans
                - Ophthalmosaurus icenicus
      - - - Gengasaurus nicosiai
          - - - Nannopterygius yasykovi
              - - Nannopterygius enthekiodon
                - Nannopterygius saveljeviensis
                - Nannopterygius borealis
            - - - Arthropterygius volgensis
                - - Arthropterygius lundi
                  - Arthropterygius thalassonotus
                  - - Arthropterygius hoybergeti
                    - Arthropterygius chrisorum
    - Platypterygiinae
      - - Brachypterygius extremus
        - Aegirosaurus leptospondylus
        - - Muiscasaurus catheti
          - - Leninia stellans
            - - Sveltonectes insolitus
              - - Athabascasaurus bitumineus
                - - Platypterygius americanus
                  - - - Acuetzpalin carranzai
                      - Platypterygius sachicarum
                      - Caypullisaurus bonapartei
                    - - - - Grendelius mordax
                          - Grendelius alekseevi
                          - Grendelius pseudoscythicus
                          - Grendelius zhuravlevi
                        - - - - Undorosaurus kielanae
                              - - Undorosaurus nessovi
                                - Undorosaurus gorodischensis
                      - - Platypterygius australis
                        - - Plutoniosaurus bedengensis
                          - Simbirskiasaurus birjukovi
                          - Platypterygius hercynicus
                          - Sisteronia seeleyi
                          - Platypterygius platydactylus
                          - Maiaspondylus lindoei

== See also ==
- List of ichthyosaurs
- Timeline of ichthyosaur research
