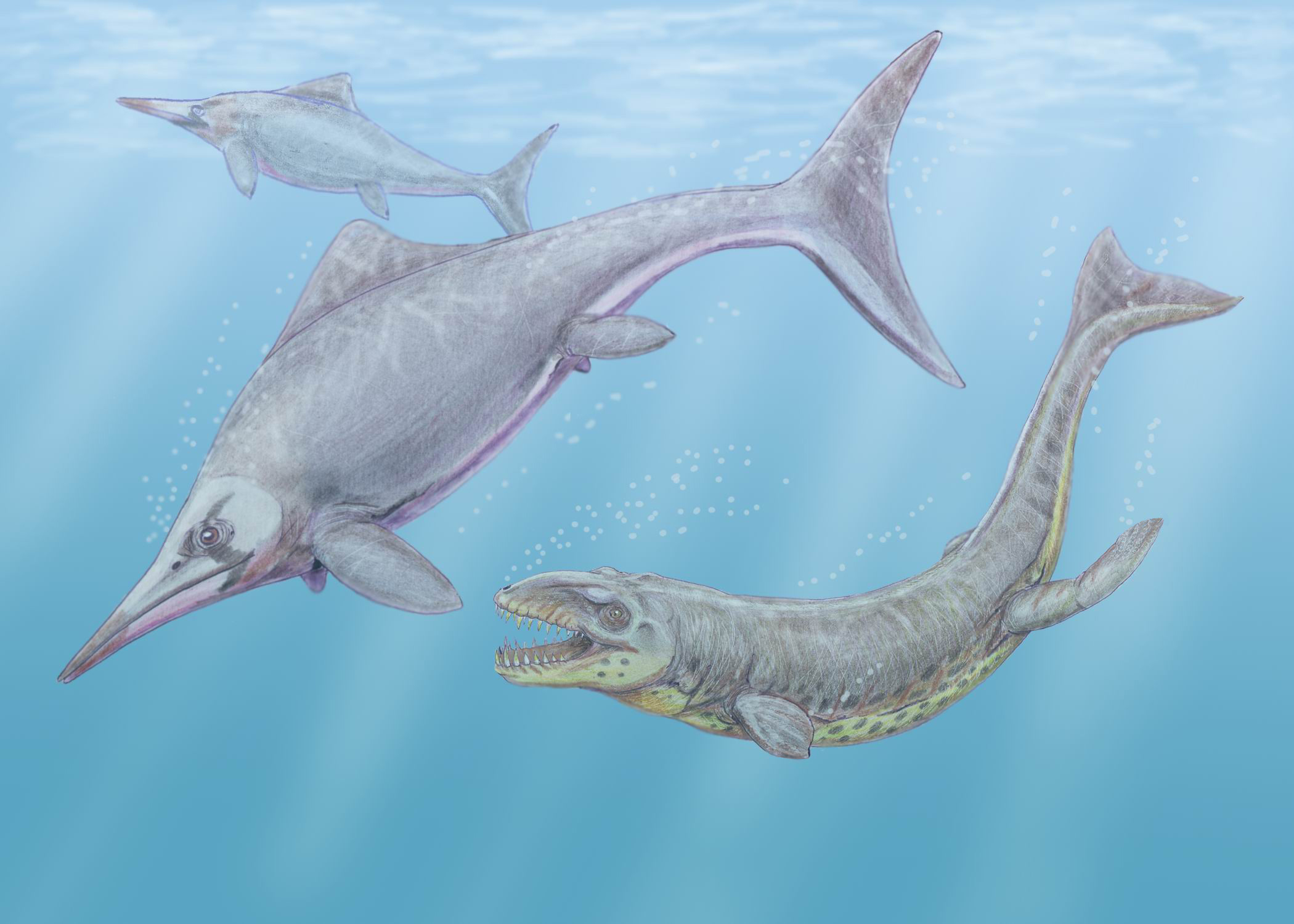
- Dakosaurus (right) pursuing a Caypullisaurus (left)

Scientific classification
- Kingdom: Animalia
- Phylum: Chordata
- Class: Reptilia
- Order: †Ichthyosauria
- Family: †Ophthalmosauridae
- Subfamily: †Platypterygiinae
- Genus: †Caypullisaurus; Fernández, 1997
- Species: †C. bonapartei

Binomial name
- †Caypullisaurus bonapartei Fernández, 1997

= Caypullisaurus =

Caypullisaurus Temporal range: Tithonian-Berriasian ~150–140.2 Ma

Extinct genus of reptiles

Caypullisaurus is an extinct genus of platypterygiine ophthalmosaurid ichthyosaur from the Late Jurassic to the Early Cretaceous (Tithonian and Berriasian stages) of Argentina. Its holotype was collected from the Vaca Muerta Formation of Cerro Lotena, Neuquen, dating to the early Tithonian stage of the Late Jurassic, about 150 million years ago. Caypullisaurus was first named by Marta Fernández in 1997 and the type species is Caypullisaurus bonapartei. It was a large ichthyosaur, measuring about 7 m (23 ft) long. The forelimbs of Caypullisaurus contained 10 digits each.

== Classification ==
It is a member of the family Ophthalmosauridae, and closely related to Platypterygius and Brachypterygius. In 2012, Caypullisaurus was found to be most closely related to Athabascasaurus and "Platypterygius" australis, and to nest within the subfamily Platypterygiinae.

=== Phylogeny ===
The following cladogram shows a possible phylogenetic position of Caypullisaurus in Ophthalmosauridae according to the analysis performed by Zverkov and Jacobs (2020).

- Ophthalmosauria
  - - Ophthalmosaurinae
      - - - - Acamptonectes densus
            - - Mollesaurus periallus
              - - Ophthalmosaurus natans
                - Ophthalmosaurus icenicus
      - - - Gengasaurus nicosiai
          - - - Nannopterygius yasykovi
              - - Nannopterygius enthekiodon
                - Nannopterygius saveljeviensis
                - Nannopterygius borealis
            - - - Arthropterygius volgensis
                - - Arthropterygius lundi
                  - Arthropterygius thalassonotus
                  - - Arthropterygius hoybergeti
                    - Arthropterygius chrisorum
    - Platypterygiinae
      - - Brachypterygius extremus
        - Aegirosaurus leptospondylus
        - - Muiscasaurus catheti
          - - Leninia stellans
            - - Sveltonectes insolitus
              - - Athabascasaurus bitumineus
                - - Platypterygius americanus
                  - - - Acuetzpalin carranzai
                      - Platypterygius sachicarum
                      - Caypullisaurus bonapartei
                    - - - - Grendelius mordax
                          - Grendelius alekseevi
                          - Grendelius pseudoscythicus
                          - Grendelius zhuravlevi
                        - - - - Undorosaurus kielanae
                              - - Undorosaurus nessovi
                                - Undorosaurus gorodischensis
                      - - Platypterygius australis
                        - - Plutoniosaurus bedengensis
                          - Simbirskiasaurus birjukovi
                          - Platypterygius hercynicus
                          - Sisteronia seeleyi
                          - Platypterygius platydactylus
                          - Maiaspondylus lindoei

== See also ==
- List of ichthyosaurs
- Timeline of ichthyosaur research
