= Mollesaurus =

Mollesaurus Temporal range: Middle Jurassic, 171.6–170 Ma

Scientific classification
- Kingdom: Animalia
- Phylum: Chordata
- Class: Reptilia
- Superorder: †Ichthyopterygia
- Order: †Ichthyosauria
- Family: †Ophthalmosauridae
- Subfamily: †Ophthalmosaurinae
- Genus: †Mollesaurus; Fernández, 1999
- Species: †M. periallus

Binomial name
- †Mollesaurus periallus Fernández, 1999

Synonyms
- Ophthalmosaurus periallus Maisch & Matzke, 2000

Extinct genus of reptiles

Mollesaurus is an extinct genus of large ophthalmosaurine ichthyosaur known from northwestern Patagonia of Argentina.

== Etymology ==
Mollesaurus was named by Marta S. Fernández in 1999 and the type species is Mollesaurus periallus. The generic name is derived from the name of the Los Molles Formation, where the holotype was collected, and sauros, Greek for "lizard". The specific name is derived from periallos, Greek for "before all others", in reference to the fact that it is the oldest ophthalmosaurid and one of the oldest thunnosaurs.

== History of study ==
Mollesaurus is known from the holotype MOZ 2282 V, articulated partial skeleton which preserved partial skull and most of the vertebral column. It was collected in the Chacaico Sur locality from the Emileia giebeli ammonoid zone of the Los Molles Formation, Cuyo Group, dating to the early Bajocian stage of the Middle Jurassic, about 171.6-170 million years ago. Mollesaurus, along with Chacaicosaurus cayi which was found at the same locality, are the only diagnostic ichthyosaur specimens from the Aalenian-Bathonian interval. It was found near Zapala city of the Neuquén Basin.

Maisch and Matzke (2000) regarded Mollesaurus to be a species of Ophthalmosaurus. However, all recent cladistic analyses found that Mollesaurus is a valid genus of ophthalmosaurid. Patrick S. Druckenmiller and Erin E. Maxwell (2010) found it to be the basalmost member of the ophthalmosaurid lineage that included Brachypterygius, Caypullisaurus and Platypterygius (but not Ophthalmosaurus). Valentin Fischer, Michael W. Maisch, Darren Naish, Ralf Kosma, Jeff Liston, Ulrich Joger, Fritz J. Krüger, Judith Pardo Pérez, Jessica Tainsh and Robert M. Appleby (2012) found it to be the basalmost member of Ophthalmosaurinae.

=== Phylogeny ===
The following cladogram shows a possible phylogenetic position of Mollesaurus in Ophthalmosauridae according to the analysis performed by Zverkov and Jacobs (2020).

- Ophthalmosauria
  - - Ophthalmosaurinae
      - - - - Acamptonectes densus
            - - Mollesaurus periallus
              - - Ophthalmosaurus natans
                - Ophthalmosaurus icenicus
      - - - Gengasaurus nicosiai
          - - - Nannopterygius yasykovi
              - - Nannopterygius enthekiodon
                - Nannopterygius saveljeviensis
                - Nannopterygius borealis
            - - - Arthropterygius volgensis
                - - Arthropterygius lundi
                  - Arthropterygius thalassonotus
                  - - Arthropterygius hoybergeti
                    - Arthropterygius chrisorum
    - Platypterygiinae
      - - Brachypterygius extremus
        - Aegirosaurus leptospondylus
        - - Muiscasaurus catheti
          - - Leninia stellans
            - - Sveltonectes insolitus
              - - Athabascasaurus bitumineus
                - - Platypterygius americanus
                  - - - Acuetzpalin carranzai
                      - Platypterygius sachicarum
                      - Caypullisaurus bonapartei
                    - - - - Grendelius mordax
                          - Grendelius alekseevi
                          - Grendelius pseudoscythicus
                          - Grendelius zhuravlevi
                        - - - - Undorosaurus kielanae
                              - - Undorosaurus nessovi
                                - Undorosaurus gorodischensis
                      - - Platypterygius australis
                        - - Plutoniosaurus bedengensis
                          - Simbirskiasaurus birjukovi
                          - Platypterygius hercynicus
                          - Sisteronia seeleyi
                          - Platypterygius platydactylus
                          - Maiaspondylus lindoei

== See also ==
- List of ichthyosaurs
- Timeline of ichthyosaur research
