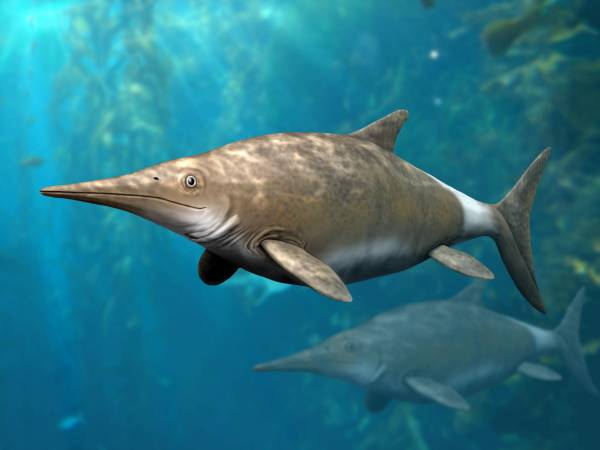
- Restoration

Scientific classification
- Kingdom: Animalia
- Phylum: Chordata
- Class: Reptilia
- Superorder: †Ichthyopterygia
- Order: †Ichthyosauria
- Family: †Ophthalmosauridae
- Subfamily: †Platypterygiinae
- Genus: †Brachypterygius von Huene, 1922

Species
- †B. extremus (Boulenger, 1904) von Huene, 1922 (type species)

= Brachypterygius =

Brachypterygius Temporal range: Late Jurassic, Kimmeridgian–Tithonian

Extinct genus of reptiles

Brachypterygius (meaning ″short wing/paddle″ in Greek) is an extinct genus of platypterygiine ophthalmosaurid ichthyosaur known from the Late Jurassic of England. The type species was originally described and named as Ichthyosaurus extremus by Boulenger in 1904. Brachypterygius was named by Huene in 1922 for the width and shortness of the forepaddle, and the type species is therefore Brachypterygius extremus. The holotype of B. extremus was originally thought to be from the Lias Group of Bath, United Kingdom, but other specimens suggest it more likely came from the Kimmeridgian Kimmeridge Clay (Late Jurassic) of Kimmeridge Bay, Dorset, UK.

== Description ==
Brachypterygius is a medium-sized ichthyosaur, with a skull length of 0.5–1.2 metres (1.6–3.9 ft) and a body length up to 4 metres (13 ft). The snout is long, as is characteristic for ichthyosaurs, with larger and more robust teeth, and a relatively smaller eye than Ophthalmosaurus. The basioccipital has a very narrow extracondylar area. The forepaddle may have five or six digits, with the maximum phalangeal count being between 8 and 16. A key feature is the three facets at the distal end of the humerus; the middle is the smallest and articulates with the intermedium, which clearly separates Brachypterygius from Ophthalmosaurus, the most common Late Jurassic ichthyosaur.

== Taxonomy ==
The holotype of Brachypterygius extremus is a single right forepaddle, clearly different from other Late Jurassic ichthyosaurs (e.g. Ophthalmosaurus). Brachypterygius is closely related to Platypterygius and Caypullisaurus.

=== Species previously assigned to Brachypterygius ===
Owen (1840) erected Ichthyosaurus trigonus based upon a single dorsal vertebra (ANSP 10124) from the Kimmeridge Clay of Westbrook, Wiltshire, UK. The holotype was long thought to be lost until it was rediscovered in 1988. Many specimens were referred to Ichthyosaurus trigonus; Bauer (1898) suggested that – what are now – Ophthalmosaurus, Brachypterygius and Nannopterygius should be synonymised into Ichthyosaurus trigonus. I. trigonus was included in the new genus Macropterygius by Huene (1922), who later (1923) made it the type species of the genus. Nowadays, I. trigonus (and hence Macropterygius) is a nomen dubium because its holotype is indistinguishable from other ophthalmosaurids. (Christopher McGowan and Ryosuke Motani mistakenly stated that I. trigonus may be synonymous with Ophthalmosaurus icenicus)

Richard Lydekker erected the species Ophthalmosaurus cantabridgiensis from the Cambridge Greensand (Albian, Early Cretaceous) of Cambridge, UK, on the basis of a humerus (NHMUK PV OR 43989). McGowan and Motani (2003) considered it to be a species of Brachypterygius, but a 2014 re-assessment of Cambridge Greensand ichthyosaurs found it to be a nomen dubium indeterminate beyond Ophthalmosaurinae. In 2020, Nikolay Zverkov and Dmitry Grigoriev reassigned this species to Maiaspondylus.

A large skull was discovered in the Kimmeridge Clay of Stowbridge, Norfolk, UK and named as a new genus and species, Grendelius mordax, by McGowan in 1976. More complete material from the Kimmeridge Clay of Kimmeridge Bay indicated that these two species were quite similar, so the two genera were synonymised. In 2003, McGowan & Motani synonymised the two species B. extremus and B. mordax into B. extremus, considering differences in the forepaddle to be of insufficient taxonomic value. However, a 2015 publication by Zverkov and colleagues instead found Grendelius mordax to be sufficiently different from Brachypterygius extremus to be considered both a separate genus and species.

== Phylogeny ==
The following cladogram shows a possible phylogenetic position of Brachypterygius in Ophthalmosauridae according to the analysis performed by Zverkov and Jacobs (2020).

- Ophthalmosauria
  - - Ophthalmosaurinae
      - - - - Acamptonectes densus
            - - Mollesaurus periallus
              - - Ophthalmosaurus natans
                - Ophthalmosaurus icenicus
      - - - Gengasaurus nicosiai
          - - - Nannopterygius yasykovi
              - - Nannopterygius enthekiodon
                - Nannopterygius saveljeviensis
                - Nannopterygius borealis
            - - - Arthropterygius volgensis
                - - Arthropterygius lundi
                  - Arthropterygius thalassonotus
                  - - Arthropterygius hoybergeti
                    - Arthropterygius chrisorum
    - Platypterygiinae
      - - Brachypterygius extremus
        - Aegirosaurus leptospondylus
        - - Muiscasaurus catheti
          - - Leninia stellans
            - - Sveltonectes insolitus
              - - Athabascasaurus bitumineus
                - - Platypterygius americanus
                  - - - Acuetzpalin carranzai
                      - Platypterygius sachicarum
                      - Caypullisaurus bonapartei
                    - - - - Grendelius mordax
                          - Grendelius alekseevi
                          - Grendelius pseudoscythicus
                          - Grendelius zhuravlevi
                        - - - - Undorosaurus kielanae
                              - - Undorosaurus nessovi
                                - Undorosaurus gorodischensis
                      - - Platypterygius australis
                        - - Plutoniosaurus bedengensis
                          - Simbirskiasaurus birjukovi
                          - Platypterygius hercynicus
                          - Sisteronia seeleyi
                          - Platypterygius platydactylus
                          - Maiaspondylus lindoei

== See also ==
- List of ichthyosaurs
- Timeline of ichthyosaur research
