= Sveltonectes =

Sveltonectes Temporal range: Early Cretaceous, 126 Ma

Scientific classification
- Kingdom: Animalia
- Phylum: Chordata
- Class: Reptilia
- Superorder: †Ichthyopterygia
- Order: †Ichthyosauria
- Family: †Ophthalmosauridae
- Subfamily: †Platypterygiinae
- Genus: †Sveltonectes; Fischer et al., 2011
- Species: †S. insolitus

Binomial name
- †Sveltonectes insolitus Fischer et al., 2011

Extinct genus of reptiles

Sveltonectes (meaning "agile swimmer" in Greek) is an extinct genus of platypterygiine ophthalmosaurid ichthyosaurs known from Ul'yanovsk region, western Russia.

== History of discovery ==
Sveltonectes is known from the holotype IRSNB R269, an almost complete three-dimensionally preserved skeleton including a partial skull. It was collected in unnamed locality, in Ul'yanovsk, dating to the late Barremian stage of the early Cretaceous, about 126 million years ago. Another thunnosaur described from the same locality, by Bogolubow (1909), is "Ichthyosaurus" steleodon. It is a nomen dubium that is twice the size and more robust than Sveltonectes.

Sveltonectes was named by Valentin Fischer, Edwige Masure, Maxim S. Arkhangelsky, and Pascal Godefroit in 2011 and the type species is Sveltonectes insolitus. The generic name is derived from sveltos, Greek for "agile", and nektes, Greek for "swimmer", and refers to its small size, streamlined skull, and powerful girdle musculature. The specific name is derived from insolitus, Latin for "unusual", in reference to the numerous unusual features of this ichthyosaur, as well as its unusual tooth morphology.

== Description ==
Like some other ophthalmosaurids, Sveltonectes has a projection on the nasal bone of the skull into the naris, a prefrontal forming part of the margin of the naris and a frontal forming part of the margin of the supratemporal fenestra. Sveltonectes is unique in that it has small, sharp teeth and numerous other peculiar features such as a very primitive prootic. The distinctive shape of these teeth suggest that it had a different feeding habit than other cretaceous ophthalmosaurids. Within the Ophthalmosauridae, Sveltonectes is most closely related to Aegirosaurus.

== Phylogeny ==
The following cladogram shows a possible phylogenetic position of Sveltonectes in Ophthalmosauridae according to the analysis performed by Zverkov and Jacobs (2020).

- Ophthalmosauria
  - - Ophthalmosaurinae
      - - - - Acamptonectes densus
            - - Mollesaurus periallus
              - - Ophthalmosaurus natans
                - Ophthalmosaurus icenicus
      - - - Gengasaurus nicosiai
          - - - Nannopterygius yasykovi
              - - Nannopterygius enthekiodon
                - Nannopterygius saveljeviensis
                - Nannopterygius borealis
            - - - Arthropterygius volgensis
                - - Arthropterygius lundi
                  - Arthropterygius thalassonotus
                  - - Arthropterygius hoybergeti
                    - Arthropterygius chrisorum
    - Platypterygiinae
      - - Brachypterygius extremus
        - Aegirosaurus leptospondylus
        - - Muiscasaurus catheti
          - - Leninia stellans
            - - Sveltonectes insolitus
              - - Athabascasaurus bitumineus
                - - Platypterygius americanus
                  - - - Acuetzpalin carranzai
                      - Platypterygius sachicarum
                      - Caypullisaurus bonapartei
                    - - - - Grendelius mordax
                          - Grendelius alekseevi
                          - Grendelius pseudoscythicus
                          - Grendelius zhuravlevi
                        - - - - Undorosaurus kielanae
                              - - Undorosaurus nessovi
                                - Undorosaurus gorodischensis
                      - - Platypterygius australis
                        - - Plutoniosaurus bedengensis
                          - Simbirskiasaurus birjukovi
                          - Platypterygius hercynicus
                          - Sisteronia seeleyi
                          - Platypterygius platydactylus
                          - Maiaspondylus lindoei

== See also ==
- List of ichthyosaurs
- Timeline of ichthyosaur research
