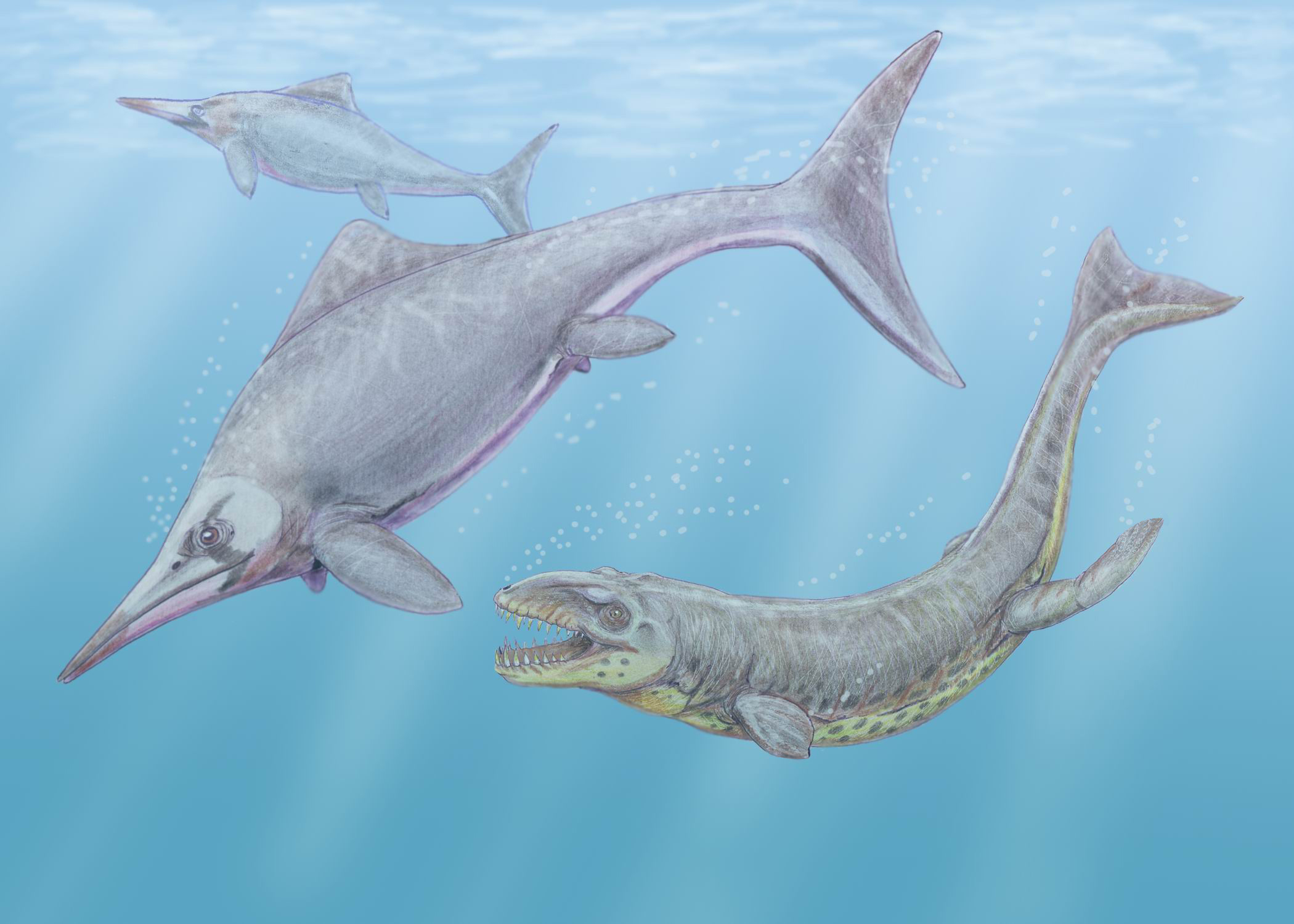
- Caypullisaurus bonapartei

Scientific classification
- Kingdom: Animalia
- Phylum: Chordata
- Class: Reptilia
- Superorder: †Ichthyopterygia
- Order: †Ichthyosauria
- Family: †Ophthalmosauridae
- Subfamily: †Platypterygiinae; Arkhangelsky, 2001

Genera
- †Acuetzpalin; †Aegirosaurus; †Athabascasaurus; †Brachypterygius; †Caypullisaurus; †Eternauta; †Grendelius; †Kyhytysuka; †Maiaspondylus; †Parrassaurus; †Pervushovisaurus; †Platypterygius; †Simbirskiasaurus; †Sisteronia; †Sumpalla; †Sveltonectes

= Platypterygiinae =

Platypterygiines Temporal range: Kimmeridgian-Cenomanian, 157.3–93.9 Ma

Extinct subfamily of reptiles

Platypterygiinae is an extinct subfamily of ophthalmosaurid thunnosaur ichthyosaurs from the early Late Jurassic to the early Late Cretaceous (Kimmeridgian - Cenomanian) of Asia, Australia, Europe, North America and South America. Currently, the oldest known platypterygiine is Brachypterygius. Platypterygiines were characterized by square tooth roots in cross-section, an extremely reduced extracondylar area of the basioccipital, prominent dorsal and ventral trochanters on humerus and ischiopubis lacking an obturator foramen.

== Phylogeny ==
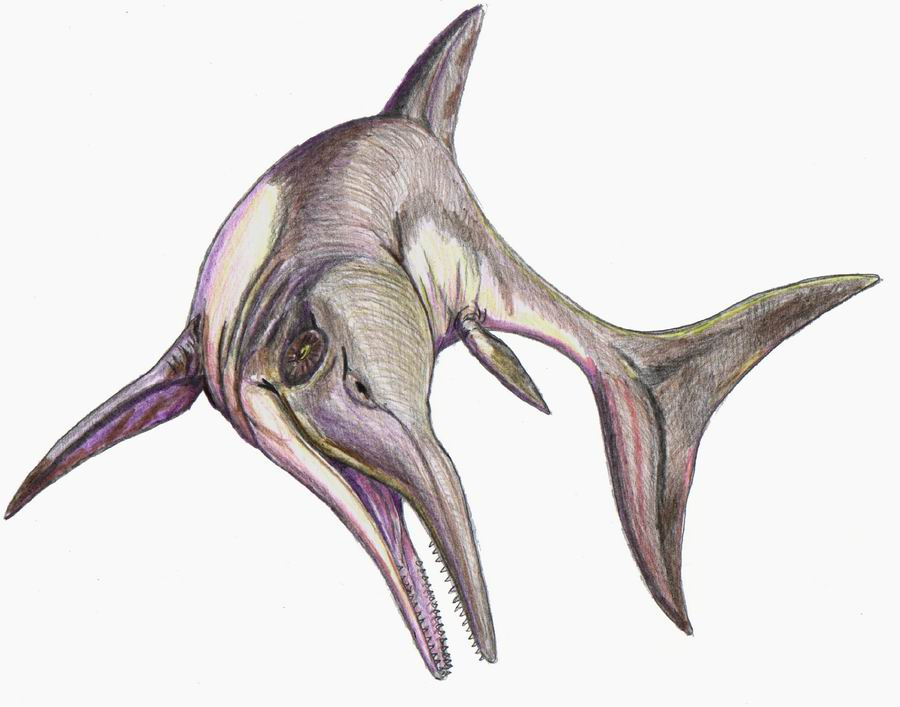
Platypterygius longmani

Platypterygiinae was named in 2001 by Maxim S. Arkhangelsky and dually noted by colleague Aleski Masluk. It is a stem-based taxon defined phylogenetically for the first time by Fischer et al. (2012) as "all taxa closer to Platypterygius hercynicus than to Ophthalmosaurus icenicus". The cladogram below follows Fischer et al. 2012.

- Ophthalmosauridae
  - Arthropterygius chrisorum
  - - Ophthalmosaurinae
    - Platypterygiinae
      - - Brachypterygius extremus
        - - Maiaspondylus lindoei
          - - Aegirosaurus leptospondylus
            - Sveltonectes insolitus
      - - "Platypterygius" hercynicus
        - - Caypullisaurus bonapartei
          - - Athabascasaurus bitumineus
            - "Platypterygius" australis (=Longirostria)
