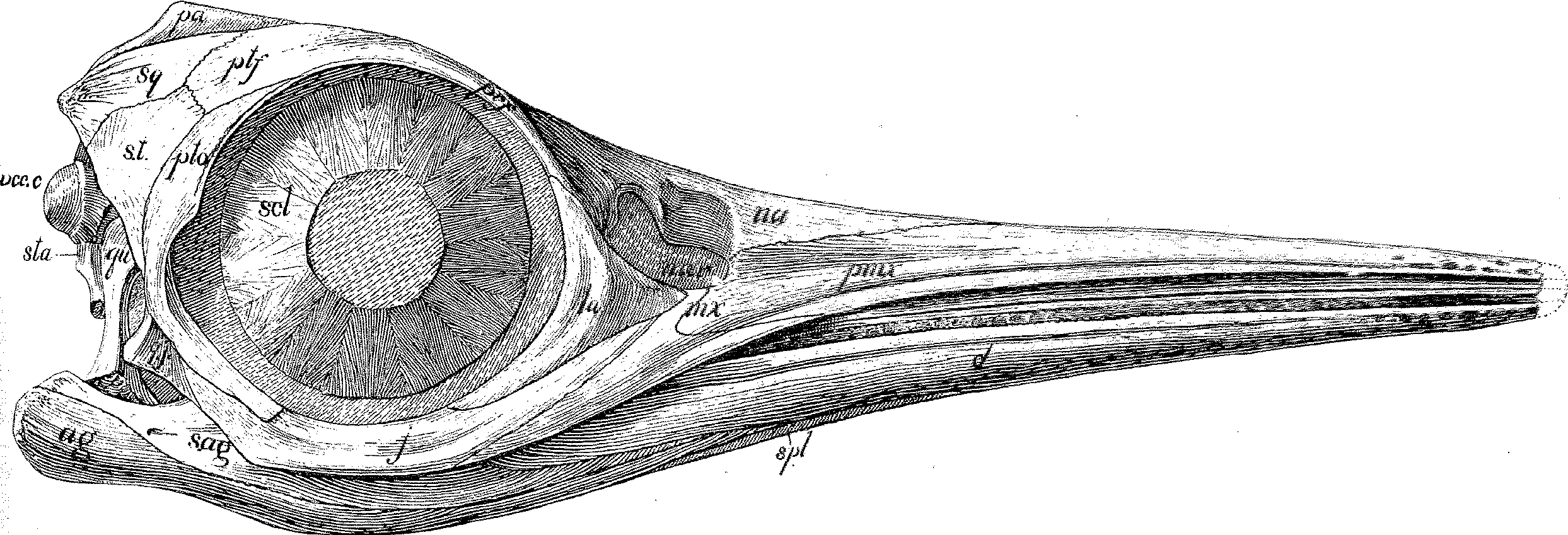
- Holotype skull of B. natans

Scientific classification
- Kingdom: Animalia
- Phylum: Chordata
- Class: Reptilia
- Order: †Ichthyosauria
- Family: †Ophthalmosauridae
- Subfamily: †Ophthalmosaurinae
- Genus: †Baptanodon; Marsh, 1880

Type species
- †Baptanodon natans Marsh, 1880

Synonyms
- Ophthalmosaurus natans Marsh, 1879; Sauranodon Marsh, 1879 (preoccupied); Microdontosaurus Gilmore, 1902

= Baptanodon =

Baptanodon Temporal range: Late Jurassic, 160–156 Ma

Extinct genus of reptiles

Baptanodon is an ichthyosaur of the Late Jurassic period (160-156 million years ago), named for its supposed lack of teeth (although teeth of this genus have since been discovered). It had a graceful 3.5 m (11 ft) long dolphin-shaped body, and its jaws were well adapted for catching squid. Major fossil finds of this genus have been recorded in North America. The type species, Sauranodon natans, was originally included under Sauranodon in 1879, but this name was preoccupied.

== Discovery and species ==
Baptanodon is a replacement name for Sauranodon applied to ichthyosaur material in 1879 and was moved to its own genus Baptanodon in 1880 when Sauranodon was found to be preoccupied. Baptanodon was considered a junior synonym of Ophthalmosaurus by Maisch & Matzke (2000). However, cladistic analyses published in the 2010s indicate that Baptanodon is not congeneric with Ophthalmosaurus icenicus.

== Classification ==
The cladogram below follows Fischer et al. 2012.

- Thunnosauria
  - Ichthyosaurus
  - - Stenopterygius
    - - Chacaicosaurus
      - Ophthalmosauridae
        - Arthropterygius
        - *
          - Ophthalmosaurinae
            - Mollesaurus
            - - Ophthalmosaurus
              - - Baptanodon
                - Acamptonectes
          - Platypterygiinae
            - - Brachypterygius
              - - Maiaspondylus
                - - Aegirosaurus
                  - Sveltonectes
            - - "Platypterygius" hercynicus
              - - Caypullisaurus
                - - Athabascasaurus
                  - "Platypterygius" australis (=Longirostria)

== Palaeobiology ==
Fossils of Baptanodon have been found in the Oxfordian-age Sundance Formation of Wyoming, which also has yielded fossils of the cryptoclidids Tatenectes and Pantosaurus, and the pliosaurid Megalneusaurus.

== See also ==
- List of ichthyosaurs
- Timeline of ichthyosaur research
