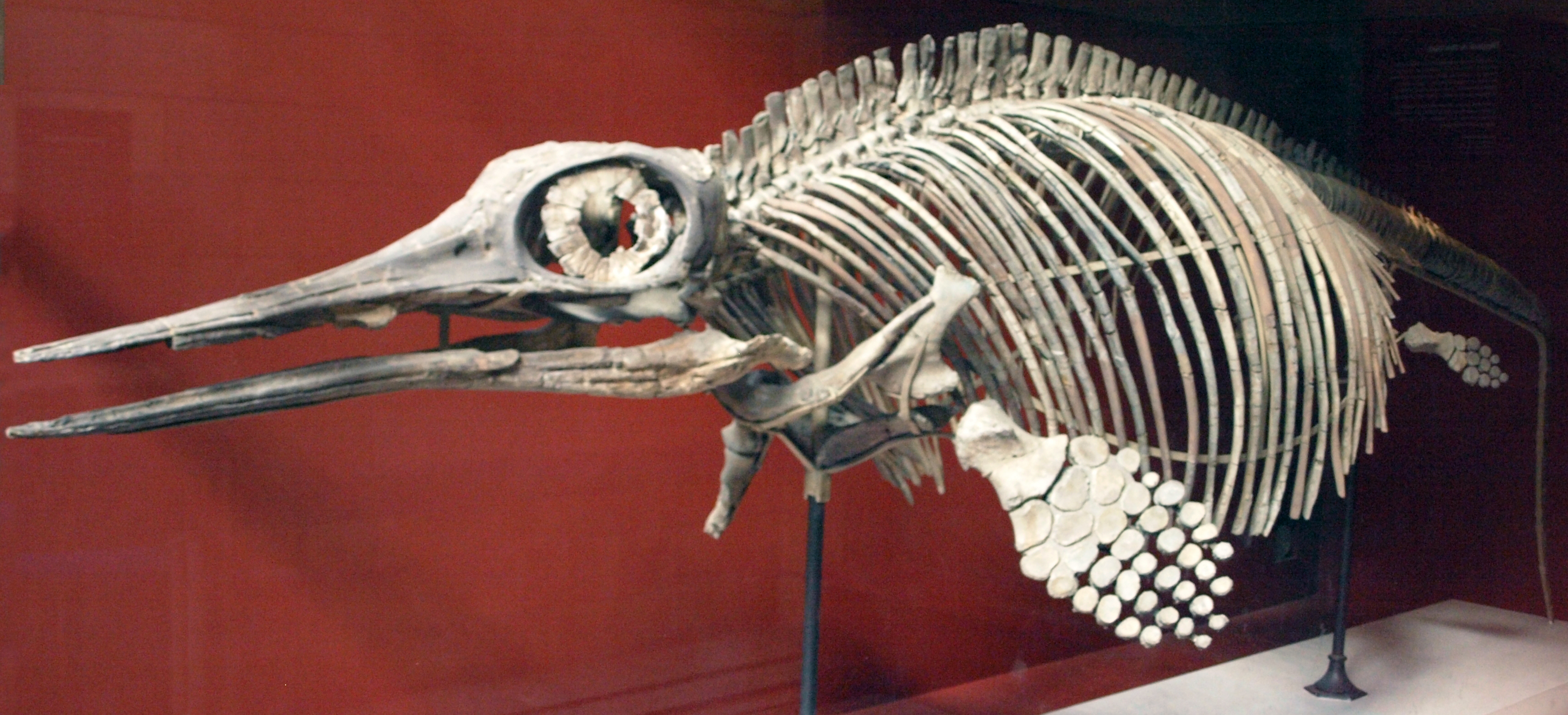
- Composite skeleton (NHMUK PV R3702, R3893, R4124) of Ophthalmosaurus icenicus at the Natural History Museum, London

Scientific classification
- Kingdom: Animalia
- Phylum: Chordata
- Class: Reptilia
- Order: †Ichthyosauria
- Family: †Ophthalmosauridae
- Subfamily: †Ophthalmosaurinae; Baur, 1887

Genera
- †Acamptonectes; †Arthropterygius; †Baptanodon; †Gengasaurus; †Jabalisaurus; †Mollesaurus; †Nannopterygius; †Ophthalmosaurus; †Thalassodraco

= Ophthalmosaurinae =

Ophthalmosaurines Temporal range: Middle Jurassic-Early Cretaceous, 171.6–99.6 Ma

Extinct subfamily of reptiles

Ophthalmosaurinae is an extinct subfamily of ophthalmosaurid thunnosaur ichthyosaurs from the Middle Jurassic to the late Early Cretaceous (Bajocian - Albian) of Europe, North America and South America. Currently, the oldest and the basalmost, known ophthalmosaurine is Mollesaurus from the early Bajocian of Argentina. Ophthalmosaurines were characterized by a large extracondylar area of the basioccipital in the form of a thick and concave peripheral band, posterodistally deflected ulnar facet of the humerus, large ulna with concave and edgy posterior surface and ischiopubis with obturator foramen.

== Phylogeny ==
Life restoration of Ophthalmosaurus

Ophthalmosaurinae was named in 1887 by Georg Baur. It is a stem-based taxon defined phylogenetically for the first time by Fischer et al. (2012) as "all taxa closer to Ophthalmosaurus icenicus than to Platypterygius hercynicus". The cladogram below follows Fischer et al. 2012.

- Ophthalmosauridae
  - Arthropterygius chrisorum
  - - Platypterygiinae
    - Ophthalmosaurinae
      - Mollesaurus periallus
      - - Ophthalmosaurus icenicus
        - - Baptanodon natans
          - Acamptonectes densus

The following cladogram shows Ophthalmosaurinae, according to the analysis performed by Jacobs and Martill (2020).

- Ophthalmosauria
  - - Platypterygiinae
    - Ophthalmosaurinae
      - - - Acamptonectes densus
          - - Mollesaurus periallus
            - - Ophthalmosaurus natans (=Baptanodon)
              - Ophthalmosaurus icenicus
      - - - Gengasaurus nicosiai
          - - "Nannopterygius" borealis
            - - Thalassodraco etchesi
              - - Nannopterygius enthekiodon
                - Nannopterygius saveljeviensis (=Paraophthalmosaurus)
                - Nannopterygius yasykovi (=Yasykovia)
        - - Arthropterygius volgensis
          - - Arthropterygius thalassonotus
            - - Arthropterygius lundi (=Janusaurus)
              - - Arthropterygius hoybergeti (=Palvennia)
                - Arthropterygius chrisorum
