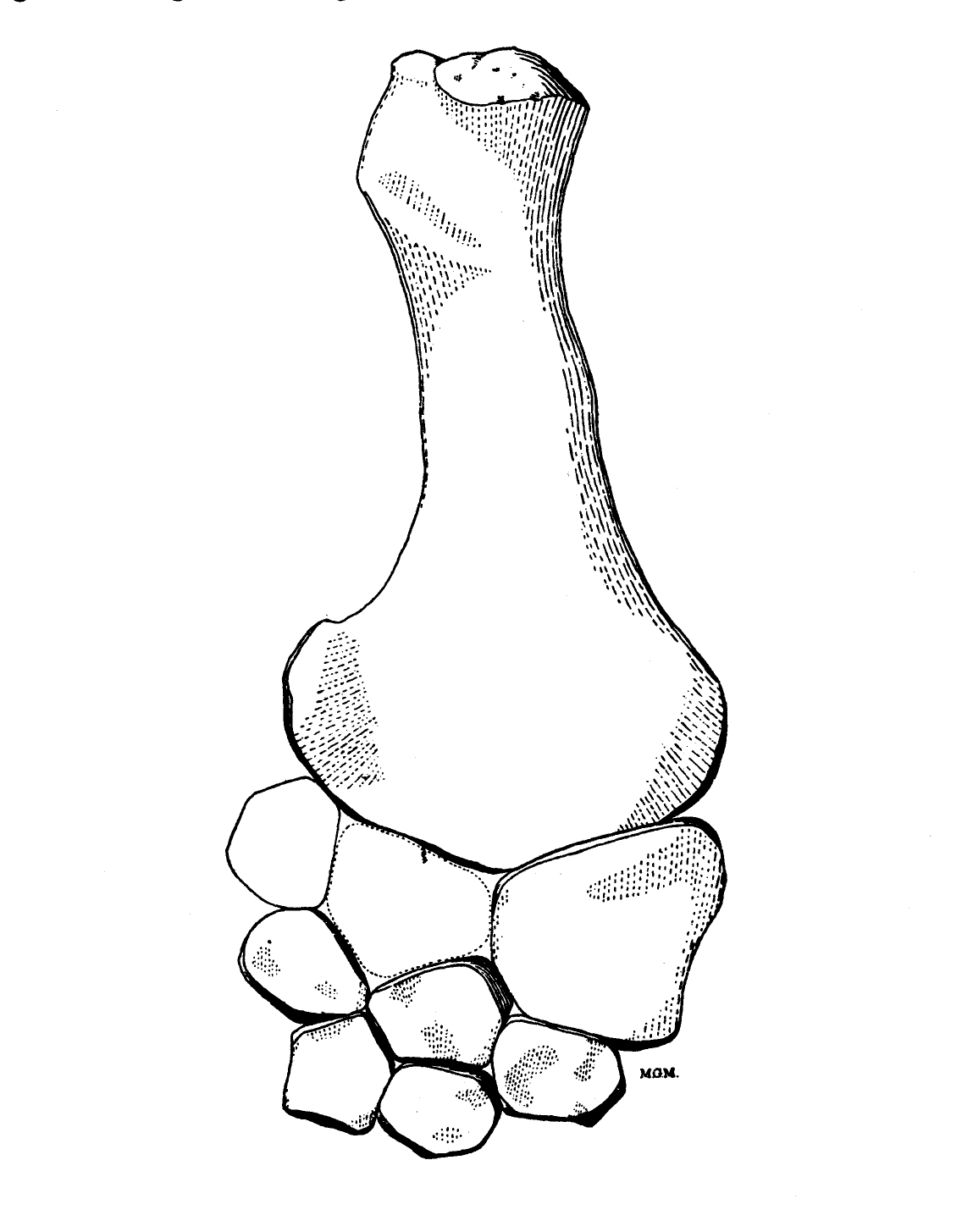
- Front paddle of the holotype

Scientific classification
- Kingdom: Animalia
- Phylum: Chordata
- Class: Reptilia
- Superorder: †Sauropterygia
- Order: †Plesiosauria
- Superfamily: †Plesiosauroidea
- Family: †Cryptoclididae
- Genus: †Tatenectes; O'Keefe and Wahl, 2003
- Species: †T. laramiensis

Binomial name
- †Tatenectes laramiensis (Knight, 1900) [originally Cimoliosaurus]

Synonyms
- Cimoliosaurus laramiensis Knight, 1900; Tricleidus? laramiensis Mehl, 1912

= Tatenectes =

Tatenectes Temporal range: Late Jurassic, Oxfordian (164-157 Ma)

Genus of extinct plesiosaur from the upper Jurassic

Tatenectes is a genus of cryptoclidid plesiosaur known from the Upper Jurassic of Wyoming, United States. Its remains were recovered from the Redwater Shale Member of the Sundance Formation, and initially described as a new species of Cimoliosaurus by Wilbur Clinton Knight in 1900. It was reassigned to Tricleidus by Maurice G. Mehl in 1912 before being given its own genus by O'Keefe and Wahl in 2003. Tatenectes laramiensis is the type and only species of Tatenectes. While the original specimen was lost, subsequent discoveries have revealed that Tatenectes was a very unusual plesiosaur. Its torso had a flattened, boxy cross-section and its gastralia (belly ribs) exhibit pachyostosis (thickening). The total length of Tatenectes has been estimated at 2–3 meters (6.6–9.8 ft).

Tatenectes is related to Kimmerosaurus, although their taxonomic placement has varied. They were once considered to be close relatives of Aristonectes in the family Cimoliasauridae or Aristonectidae, but later assigned to Cryptoclididae. The unusual body shape and pachyostotic gastralia of Tatenectes would have helped to make it more stable and resistant to turbulence. Based on stomach contents, Tatenectes fed on cephalopods and fish. It would have lived in the shallow waters of the Sundance Sea, an epicontinental sea covering much of North America during part of the Jurassic. Tatenectes shared its habitat with invertebrates, fish, ichthyosaurs, and other plesiosaurs, including another cryptoclidid, Pantosaurus, and the large pliosaurid Megalneusaurus.

== History of study ==
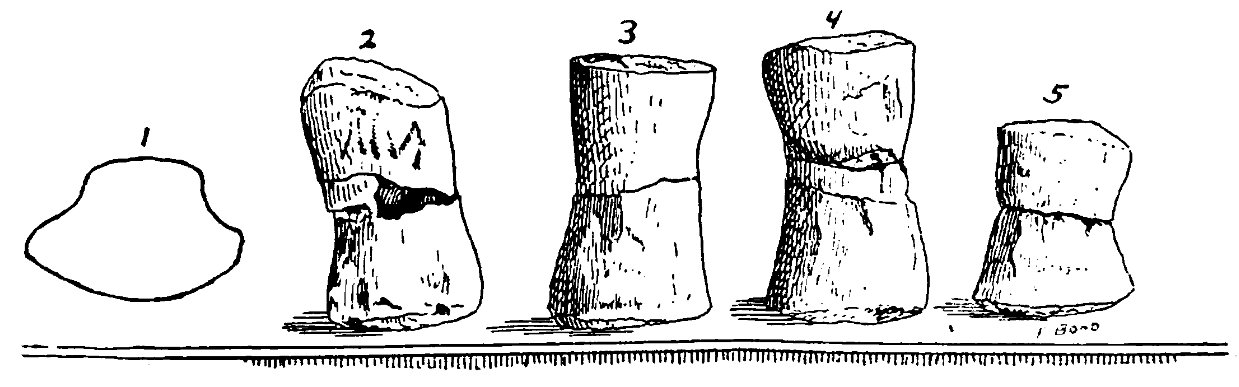
Illustration of the proximal phalanges of the holotype from Knight's description (leftmost drawing depicts a cross-section)

All known specimens of Tatenectes come from the Redwater Shale Member in the upper part of the Sundance Formation. This formation is located in Wyoming, in the Eastern Rocky Mountains. An incomplete plesiosaur skeleton preserving multitudinous vertebrae and a nearly complete forelimb from the Sundance Formation was described by Wilbur C. Knight in 1900. With this specimen as a holotype, which was never assigned a specimen number, he named a new species of Cimoliosaurus, C. laramiensis. In 1912, Maurice G. Mehl questioned the assignment of C. laramiensis to Cimoliosaurus, noting that Cimoliosaurus was a catch-all, and that since this genus was named based on vertebrae, the vertebrae of C. laramiensis would have to be similar to those of the type species, C. magnus. He was unable to find such similarities, and provisionally reclassified C. laramiensis as a species of Tricleidus, due to the anatomy of its forelimbs.

Although the holotype specimen of T. laramiensis has since been lost, Knight's description of the specimen was sufficient to determine that T. laramiensis is a valid species. In 2003, F. Robin O'Keefe and William Wahl, JR. referred another specimen housed at the Tate Geological Museum to this species. This specimen, listed under the specimen numbers UW 15943 and UW 24801, consists of vertebrae, ribs, a shoulder girdle, a partial forelimb, and a fragmentary skull and was assigned as a neotype. Additionally, O'Keefe and Wahl noted that the shoulder girdle of this species was quite different from that of Tricleidus, so they named a new genus, Tatenectes, to include T. laramiensis. The name Tatenectes honours Marion and Inez Tate, founders of the Tate Museum in Casper, Wyoming in 1980 and combines this with the Greek word nektes, meaning "diver." O'Keefe and Hallie P. Street assigned more material to Tatenectes laramiensis in 2009, including UW 24215, a partial skeleton including further cranial, vertebral, pectoral, and phalangeal elements. Another skeleton, USNM 536976, was assigned to this species by O'Keefe and colleagues in 2011. This specimen preserved 22 vertebrae, ribs, gastralia, and complete pelves.

== Description ==
Size comparison

Tatenectes is a small plesiosaur, a group of marine reptiles well adapted to aquatic life. Tatenectes is a "plesiosauromorph", meaning that it would have had an elongated neck, small head, and longer humeri than femora, as opposed to the short necks and large skulls and femora of "pliosauromorphs". In 1900, Knight estimated that Tatenectes was probably less than 3.7 meters (12 ft). O'Keefe and Street later estimated a smaller total length of around 2 meters (6.6 ft) in 2009, although O'Keefe and colleagues gave a maximum length of 3 meters (9.8 ft) two years later. The overall shape of Tatenectes is very unusual among plesiosaurs, with the body being flattened and rather short back-to-front. The squamosals, bones located at the rear of the skull, are tall, three-pronged elements which form an arch over the back face of the skull. This structure, the squamosal arch, is an identifying plesiosaurian trait. There is an opening between the pterygoids (bones that form part of the palate) known as the anterior interpterygoid vacuity. Posterior to this opening, the pterygoids thicken and project downwards. When the skull is viewed from below, the parasphenoid (a bone located between the palate and braincase) is obscured by other bones. This palatal configuration is a distinctive characteristic of Tatenectes. Another such trait is the shape of its teeth, which were small and thin, bearing elongated roots and low enamel ridges.

The total number of cervical (neck) vertebrae in Tatenectes is unknown. The neural spines of these vertebrae are short and angled posteriorly. Many features of the cervical vertebrae can be used to identify this genus: the cervical centra (vertebral bodies) are considerably shorter (in length) than wide, and are not constricted in the middle; the articulations for the cervical ribs are short but pronounced; the articular faces of the cervical vertebrae are round and weakly defined; the subcentral foramina (two small openings on the underside of the centrum) of the cervical vertebrae are positioned further apart than typical in related plesiosaurs. The form of the torso in Tatenectes is very distinctive. Flattened and spheroid in shape, the torso has a somewhat boxy cross-section. There are sixteen dorsal (back) vertebrae in Tatenectes, which, when articulated, form a considerably flatter arch than seen in related taxa. The dorsal neural spines are inclined anteriorly. The dorsal ribs articulate with the vertebrae horizontally and are deflected backwards, contributing to the flatness of the body. The gastralia (belly ribs) Tatenectes are unusually large for its size that exhibit pachyostosis (thickening). The medial (midline) gastralia are relatively straight, while the lateral (outer) gastralia are strongly J-shaped. Tatenectes bears four sacral (hip) vertebrae, which are smaller than the dorsal vertebrae. The centra of the caudal (tail) vertebrae are anteroposteriorly short. All of the vertebrae have amphicoelous centra (bearing concave articular faces).

Reconstructed pelvis

The morphology of the medial process of the scapula of Tatenectes is diagnostic of this genus. These processes are anteroposteriorly short, with the posterior ends of each process contacting the other along the midline and a notch separating their anterior ends. The top of this notch is overlain by a distinctive clavicle, which is flat and simple in morphology. The pectoral fenestra (an opening enclosed by the scapula and coracoid) is rounded and enlarged. The posterior region of the coracoid is much thinner than the rest of the pectoral girdle. The humerus has a slender, elongated shaft and is another bone with a distinctive shape. The surfaces of the humerus that articulated with the lower arm bones (radius and ulna) have roughly equal lengths. The humerus also bears articulations that indicate there were two additional bones in the lower arm. Tatenectes had six carpals (wrist bones). The metacarpals and proximal phalanges are mildly flattened, with a groove on each side of their top surfaces, while the distal phalanges are flattened more strongly. The pelvic girdle of Tatenectes is wider than long and has a flatter bottom surface than typical among plesiosaurs, making it short top-to-bottom. Each pubic bone is flat and plate-like, with a notch on its front rim forming a projection known as an anterolateral horn. The ischium is more robust where it forms the acetabulum, thinning posteriorly. The straight, gracile ilium forms an acute angle with the ischium when viewed from the side, yet another identifying characteristic.

== Classification ==
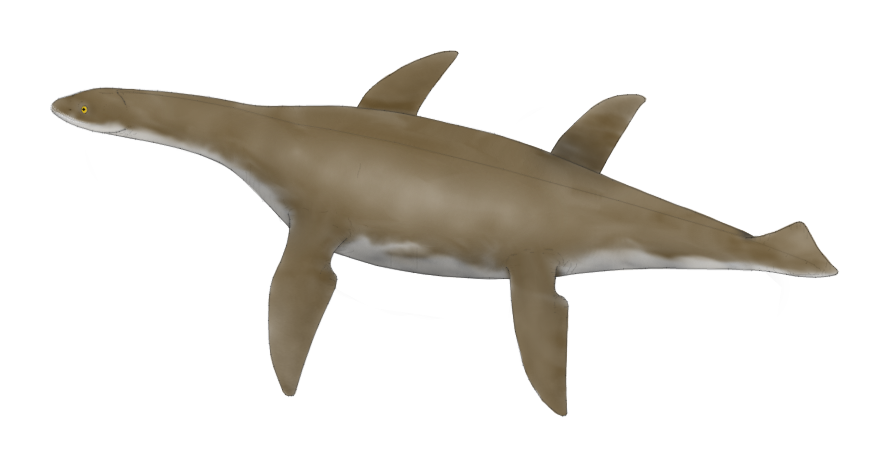
Life restoration

Tatenectes has had a complicated taxonomic history. While it had previously been considered a species of Cimoliasaurus or Tricleidus, O'Keefe and Wahl found it to be the sister taxon of Kimmerosaurus in 2001. These two genera, as well as Aristonectes, were considered to be part of Cimoliasauridae, with Kaiwhekea being either a member of this family or its closest known relative. In 2009, O'Keefe and Street considered that utilizing the name "Cimoliasauridae" for this group was a poor choice since they found Cimoliasaurus to actually belong to a different group, Elasmosauridae. The group containing Tatenectes, Kimmerosaurus, Aristonectes, and Kaiwhekea was subsequently named Aristonectidae. However, in 2011, O'Keefe and colleagues noted the problematic nature of Aristonectes and Kaiwhekea. Due to their unusual morphology, these two genera are difficult to classify, making their relation to Tatenectes ambiguous. Further studies have recovered Tatenectes as a member of Cryptoclididae, where it is still found to be a close relative of Kimmerosaurus, in addition to Cryptoclidus. Aristonectes and Kaiwhekea, however, are now thought to be derived elasmosaurids known as aristonectines.

The following cladogram follows that of Roberts and colleagues, 2020.

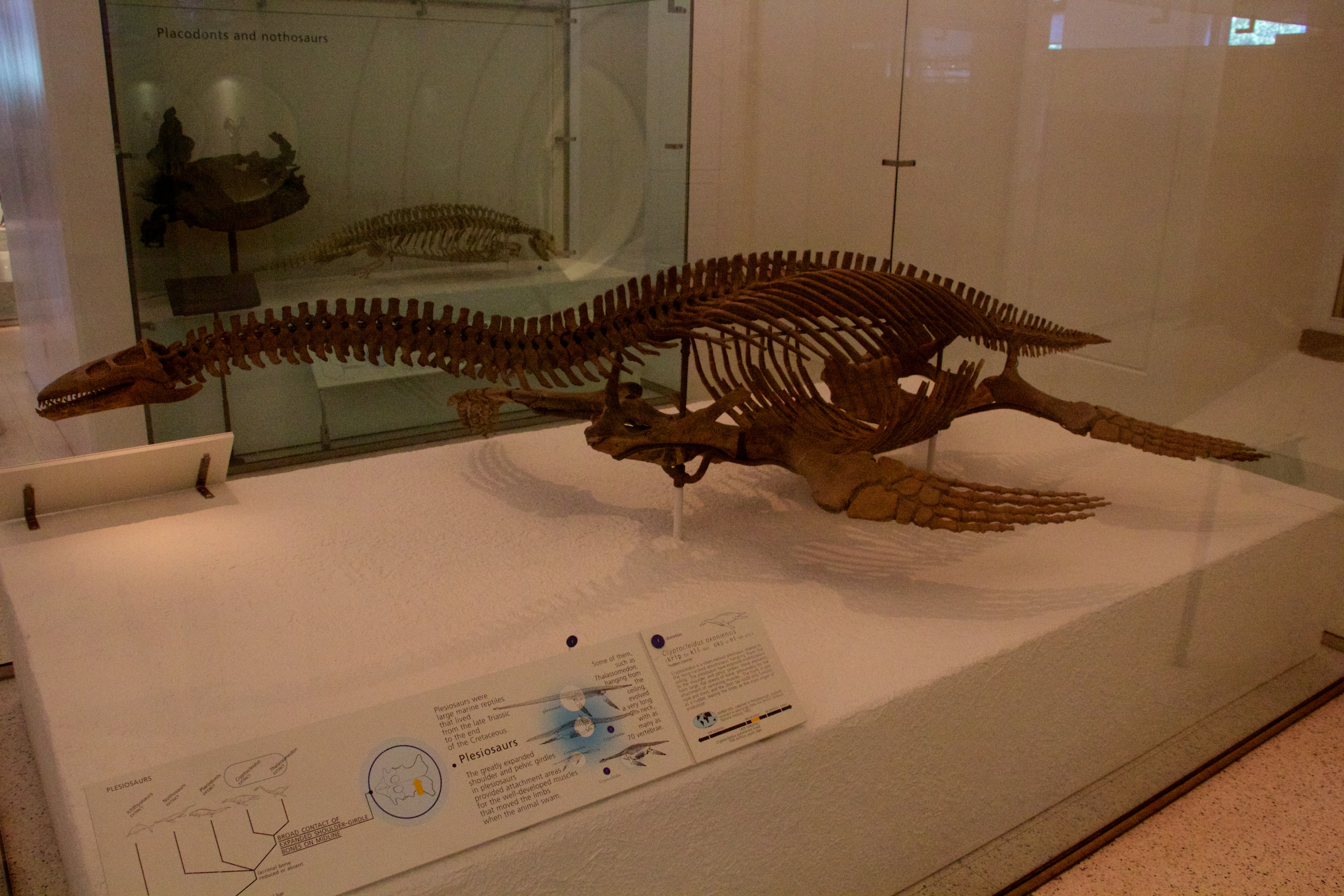
Mounted skeleton of Cryptoclidus, another cryptoclidid

- - - Plesiosaurus manselii
    - Pantosaurus striatus
  - - Abyssosaurus nataliae
    - - Colymbosaurus svalbardensis
      - Colymbosaurus megadeirus
- - - Tricleidus seeleyi
    - - Picrocleidus beloclis
      - Muraenosaurus leedsi
  - - - Cryptoclidus eurymerus
      - - Kimmerosaurus langhami
        - Tatenectes laramiensis
    - - Djupedalia engeri
      - - Spitrasaurus spp.
        - Ophthalmothule cryostea

== Paleobiology ==
Restored cross-sections of the torsos of Tatenectes (left) and Muraenosaurus (right). Note the much flatter shape of the former, and its thickened midline gastralium

Pachyostosis, as seen in Tatenectes, is unusual among plesiosaurs, and only a handful of genera, such as Pachycostasaurus, exhibit it. While many skeletal elements of Pachycostasaurus are pachyostoic, Tatenectes is even more unusual in that the gastralia are the only pachyostotic bones, the dorsal ribs being unmodified. Pachyostosis describes the thickening of a bone's periosteal cortex, thereby making the bone larger, and often occurs with osteosclerosis, or increased bone density. Conversely, an animal's bone density can be decreased through osteoporosis. Despite its gastralia being pachyostotic, Tatenectes does not exhibit osteosclerosis, but it does have a layer of osteoporotic bone between the layers of pachyostotic bone, an unprecedented condition. The pachyostotic bone is concentrated around the midline of the ventral thorax. This, together with the unusually flat body shape, led O'Keefe and colleagues to hypothesize that Tatenectes would have been more resistant to turbulence, particularly roll, than other plesiosaurs, increasing its stability when swimming close to the surface in shallow water.

In addition to pachyostosis, lung deflation could also have been used by Tatenectes (and other plesiosaurs) to gain negative buoyancy, helping it dive. Plesiosaurs swallowed stones known as gastroliths. While it has been proposed that these could have been used for ballast or buoyancy control, the effectiveness of this is controversial. The stones may have had a digestive function, or their ingestion may have been accidental. It is also possible, although more controversial, that gastroliths were used for other purposes such as alleviation of discomfort or mineral supplements. Additionally, gastroliths may have had a variety of functions instead of being limited to just one. Stomach contents of Tatenectes include the hooklets of coleoid cephalopod and teeth and denticles from a small hybodont shark, indicating that Tatenectes fed on these animals. These prey items show that Tatenectes was not a bottom feeder, unlike some elasmosaurids as indicated by their stomach contents.

== Paleoenvironment ==
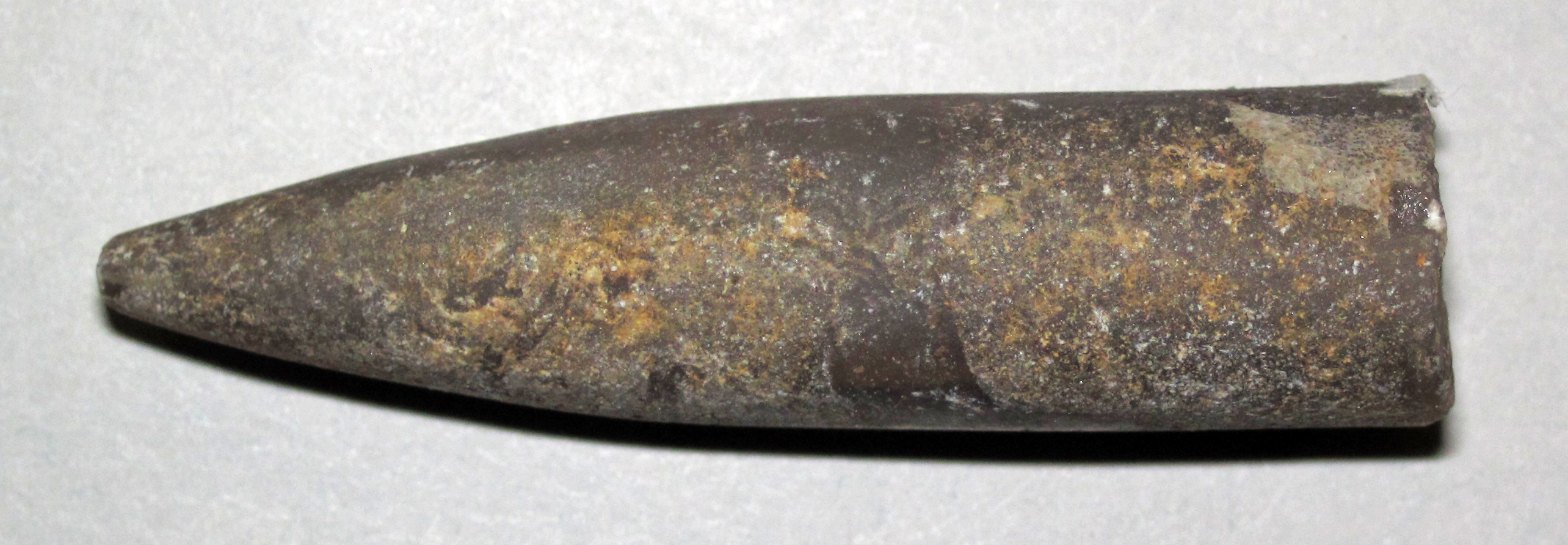
Belemnites like this Pachyteuthis would have been an important food source for the marine reptiles of the Sundance Formation

Tatenectes comes from the Oxfordian-aged (Upper Jurassic) rocks of the Redwater Shale Member of the Sundance Formation. This member is about 30–60 meters (98–197 ft) thick. While mainly composed of grayish green shale, it also has layers of yellow limestone and sandstone, the former layers containing plentiful fossils of marine life. The Sundance Formation was deposited in a shallow epicontinental sea known as the Sundance Sea. From the Yukon and Northwest Territories of Canada, where it was connected to the open ocean, this sea spanned inland southwards to New Mexico and eastward to the Dakotas. When Tatenectes was alive, most of the Sundance Sea was less than 40 meters (130 ft) deep. Based on δ^{18}O isotope ratios in belemnite fossils, the temperature in the Sundance Sea would have been 13–17 °C (55–63 °F) below and 16–20 °C (61–68 °F) above the thermocline.

The paleobiota of the Sundance Formation includes foraminiferans and algae, in addition to a variety of animals. Many invertebrates are known from the Sundance Formation, represented by crinoids, echinoids, serpulid worms, ostracods, malacostracans, and mollusks. The mollusks include cephalopods such as ammonites and belemnites, bivalves such as oysters and scallops, and gastropods. Fish from the formation are represented by hybodont and neoselachian chondrichthyans as well as teleosts (including Pholidophorus). Marine reptiles are uncommon, but are represented by four species. Plesiosaurs, in addition to Tatenectes, include another cryptoclidid, Pantosaurus striatus, as well as the large pliosaurid Megalneusaurus rex. Besides plesiosaurs, marine reptiles are also represented by the ichthyosaur Ophthalmosaurus (or, possibly, Baptanodon) natans, the most abundant marine reptile of the Sundance Formation.

== See also ==
- Timeline of plesiosaur research
- List of plesiosaurs
