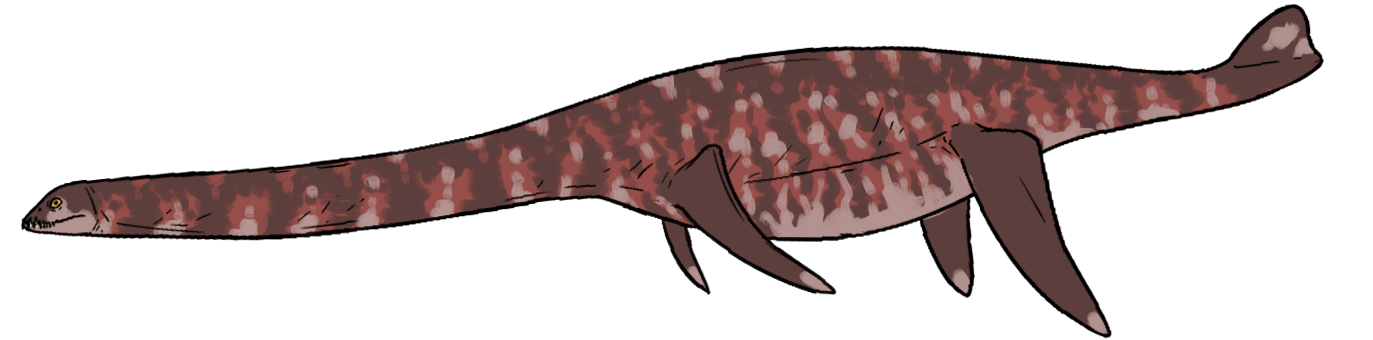
- Life restoration

Scientific classification
- Kingdom: Animalia
- Phylum: Chordata
- Class: Reptilia
- Superorder: †Sauropterygia
- Order: †Plesiosauria
- Superfamily: †Plesiosauroidea
- Family: †Cryptoclididae
- Genus: †Abyssosaurus; Berezin, 2011

Type species
- †Abyssosaurus nataliae Berezin, 2011

= Abyssosaurus =

Abyssosaurus Temporal range: Early Cretaceous, 133–130 Ma

Extinct genus of reptiles

Abyssosaurus ("bottomless lizard") is an extinct genus of cryptoclidid plesiosaur known from the Early Cretaceous of Chuvash Republic, western Russia. The type specimen, consisting of a fairly complete postcranial skeleton and parts of a skull, was discovered around the left tributary of the Sura River by Vasily V. Mita; it was found alongside the remains of a possible fetus, though this has not been described. Subsequently, the specimen entered the collection of the Museum of Chuvash Natural Historical Society. It was described in 2011 by Alexander Yu Berezin, who named its type species, A. nataliae, after his wife and colleague, Nataliya Berezina. While Berezin initially believed that Abyssosaurus was a basal aristonectid, part of a lineage whose later members evolved into giant filter-feeders, later studies have concluded that it was instead related to Colymbosaurus.

Abyssosaurus was aberrant compared to other cryptoclidids. It was a large animal, with a total length of 7 m (23 ft), of which half was its neck. Its skull was unusually short and triangular in comparison to that of other plesiosaurs, and its eye sockets were very large. Parts of its overall skeleton retain juvenile traits, a condition known as paedomorphosis which is observed in various deep-sea vertebrates. Parts of the gastralia (abdominal ribs) and flippers were very robust, an example of pachyostosis which would have made it less buoyant. The hind flippers were considerably longer than the front flippers, which would have allowed it to float diagonally above the seabed. It has been suggested that Abyssosaurus spent much of its life in the bathypelagic zone, where it would have hunted small invertebrates such as cephalopods and crustaceans.

== History of discovery ==
In 1992, Russian palaeontologist Vasily V. Mita discovered the partial skeleton of a plesiosaur around the left tributary of the Sura River, in Chuvashia, Russia. Strata from that location, belonging to the Speetoniceras versicolor Subzone, have been dated to the late/upper Hauterivian age of the Early Cretaceous. Twenty cervical (neck) vertebrae were collected at first, though, in 1998, additional remains were discovered. The specimen, MChEIO no. PM/1, was transferred to the collection of the Museum of Chuvash Natural Historical Society. In 2011, the specimen was described by Alexander Yu Berezin, who designated it as the holotype of a new genus and species of plesiosaur, Abyssosaurus nataliae. The genus name derives from the Greek abyssos ("bottomless") and the Latin saurus ("lizard"), in reference to adaptations for a deepwater environment, while the species name refers to Nataliya Berezina, the wife and associate of the author. At the time, MChEIO no. PM/1 was believed to lack cranial (skull) elements. It was thus described based solely on postcranial elements. However, it later turned out that cranial elements were present in the specimen, and that they had been packed into the area of the pectoral (shoulder) girdle. Accordingly, in 2018, Berezin published a second paper, discussing Abyssosaurus' cranial anatomy, followed by a third in 2019.

== Description ==
=== Size ===
Abyssosaurus was a large plesiosaur with an estimated total body length of 6.7–7 m (22–23 ft), with roughly half of its length consisting of its neck, and body mass of 1.24 metric tons (1.37 short tons).

=== Skull and dentition ===
The skull of Abyssosaurus measured roughly 30 cm (12 in) in length, and 21 cm (8.3 in) in height, though the latter figure goes up to 23 cm (9.1 in) if the mandible (lower jaw) is counted. It is unusually short and triangular compared to that of other plesiosaurs. The premaxilla is tall, roughly as long as it is high, and is triangular in cross-section. The maxilla, known only from three fragments, is also triangular in cross-section, and is narrowed dorsally (at the top). It has similarities to the maxillae of young elasmosaurids, such as the deflection of the apex cutting edge and the lack of development to the rear portion of the bone. The jugal is thin and flat, lacking the dorsal part. Abyssosaurus' orbits (eye sockets) were very large, a trait otherwise only observed in the distantly related cryptoclidid Ophthalmothule. This has been correlated to paedomorphosis, the retention of juvenile traits into adulthood. The parietal bone is small and short, resembling that of Kimmerosaurus. Abyssosaurus is the only cryptoclidid, aside from Muraenosaurus, to preserve a prootic; in Abyssosaurus, it is more massive than in that taxon. The exoccipital and opisthotic bones resemble those of other cryptoclidids, though are larger and more massive. It is not known how many teeth Abyssosaurus had. The mandible is incompletely known, preserving only part of the dentary, the surangular, angular, and articular.

=== Postcranial skeleton ===
The cervical (neck) column of Abyssosaurus is not known in its entirety, preserving only forty-four vertebrae. Based on extrapolations from other plesiosaurs, it may have had up to fifty-one cervical vertebrae. The cervical ribs were short and compressed dorsoventrally (from top-to-bottom) and had rounded ends. Twenty dorsal (body) vertebrae were present, or twenty-three if the pectoral vertebrae are counted. They decreased in size towards the sacral (hip) region. Abyssosaurus' ribs were large. Three sacral vertebrae were present. It is not known how many vertebrae were present in the tail. Unusually, the gastralia (abdominal ribs) were thickened, particularly in the centre. This condition, known as pachyostosis, would have made the animal considerably less buoyant. The clavicles of Abyssosaurus were greatly atrophied. The flippers, similar to the gastralia, were pachyostotic. Like other colymbosaurs, but otherwise unusual among plesiosaurs, the rear flippers of Abyssosaurus were considerably longer than the front ones. This is possibly another paedomorphic trait, though one present in the family at large as opposed to just Abyssosaurus. Due to the morphological disparity between the front and hind flippers, Berezin suggested that the front set was probably used for steering and stabilisation, while the hind set was used for propulsion.

== Taxonomy ==
In his paper describing Abyssosaurus, Berezin suggested that it was an aberrant member of Aristonectinae, then a family of its own (Aristonectinae) within Cryptocleidoidea. He suggested that it was a sister taxon of the invalid Cimoliasaurus magnus, and that both genera were phylogenetically intermediate between basal aristonectines, such as Kimmerosaurus and Tatenectes (both no longer considered aristonectines) and derived aristonectines, such as Aristonectes and Kaiwhekea. In a paper published two years later discussing the taxonomy of plesiosaurs from the English Kimmeridge Clay Formation, Roger B. J. Benson and Timothy Bowdler performed a phylogenetic analysis of cryptoclidian plesiosaurs. They concluded that, instead of being an aristonectine, A. nataliae was instead a colymbosaurine, sister to Colymbosaurus proper. Subsequent analyses, such as that of the paper describing Ophthalmothule, recovered the same result.

Below is a cladogram of the Cryptoclididae, after Benson & Bowdler (2014):

- - Plesiopterys
  - - Xenopsaria (Elasmosauridae + Leptocleidia)
    - Cryptoclididae
      - - - - Picrocleidus
            - Muraenosaurus
          - Tricleidus
        - - - Tatenectes
            - Kimmerosaurus
          - Cryptoclidus
      - - - - Abyssosaurus
            - Colymbosaurus
          - Spitrasaurus
          - Djupedalia
        - - "Plesiosaurus" manselli
          - Pantosaurus

== Palaeobiology ==
=== Lifestyle ===
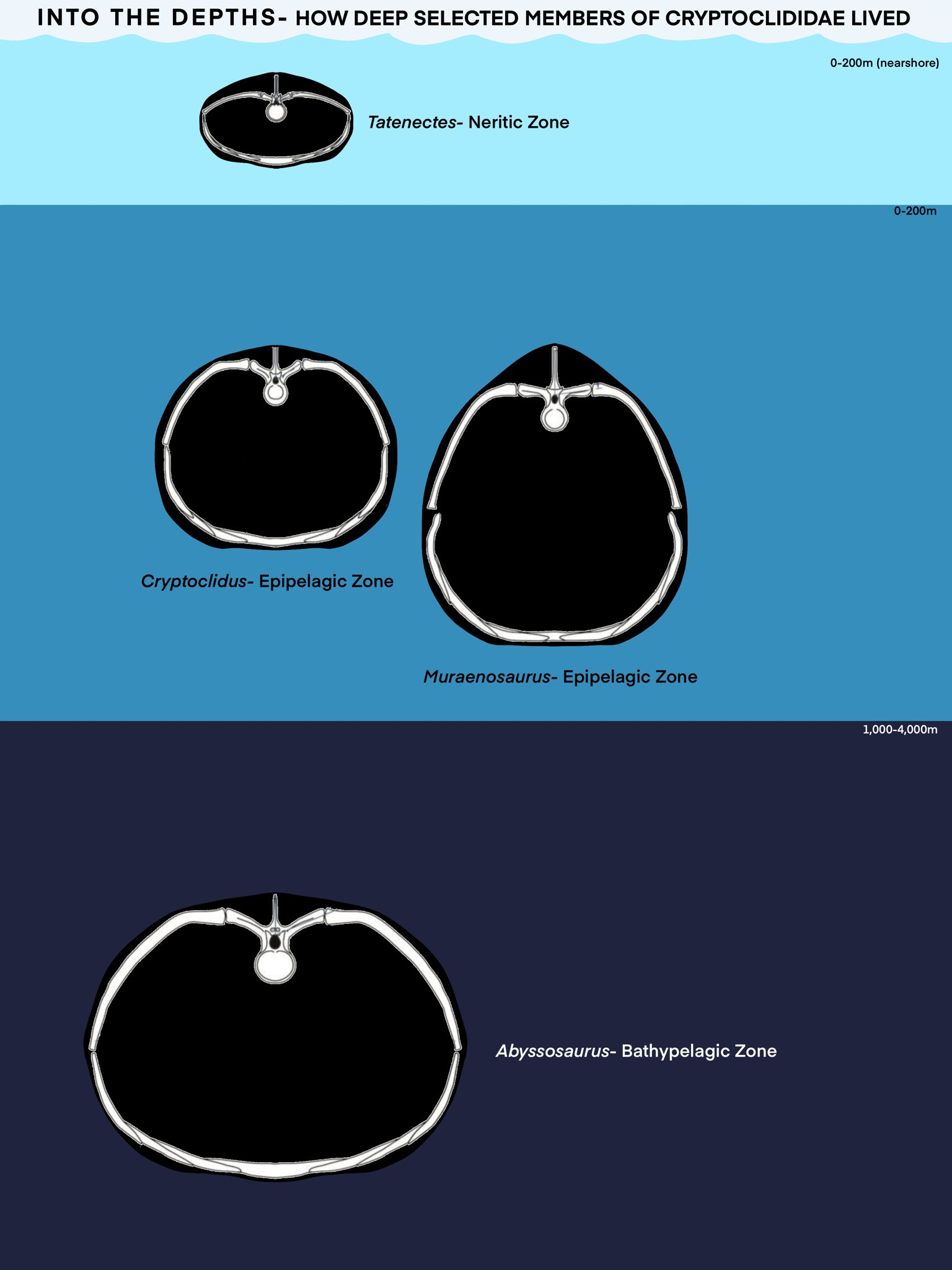
Cryptoclidid cross sections

In an attempt to explain the paedomorphic attributes of Abyssosaurus, Berezin noted that adaptation to cold, harsh, deep-sea conditions is accompanied by the loss of ontogenetic stages. Deep-sea vertebrates (examples being the Greenland shark, Somniosus microcephalus, and the sperm whale, Physeter macrocephalus) not only retain the paedomorphic features of their young, but also exhibit behaviours similar to those of much younger animals. Slow, relatively sedentary lifestyles are adopted by both taxa. Though the physiology behind it is poorly understood, modern sperm whales can dive to great depths, then come to rest hanging vertically near the top of the water column. Abyssosaurus likely lived in a similar fashion. Berezin speculated that it might have spent much of its life in the bathypelagic zone, occasionally rising to the surface to breathe. Its thorax was very broad, indicating a very large lung volume and suggests that it held its breath for extended periods of time. This contrasts other cryptoclidids, which lived in shallow water environments and had to be more manoeuvrable. Benthic clades that were staples of the cryptoclidid diet, such as cephalopods and crustaceans, are common in such environments, as are brachipods. Based on the length of its hind flippers and the likelihood of its front flippers being primarily used for stability, Alexander Berezin suggested that Abyssosaurus may have hovered diagonally over the seabed in order to find food, and that other colymbosaurs operated in much the same way.

=== Reproduction ===
Alongside the holotype of Abyssosaurus were remains tentatively attributed to a foetus of the same taxon, though this specimen has yet to be described. This suggests a viviparous method of reproduction, wherein young finish development within the body cavity and are given birth to (as opposed to oviparity, wherein young undergo the majority of their development in eggs), as in other plesiosaur lineages.

== See also ==
- Timeline of plesiosaur research
- List of plesiosaur genera
