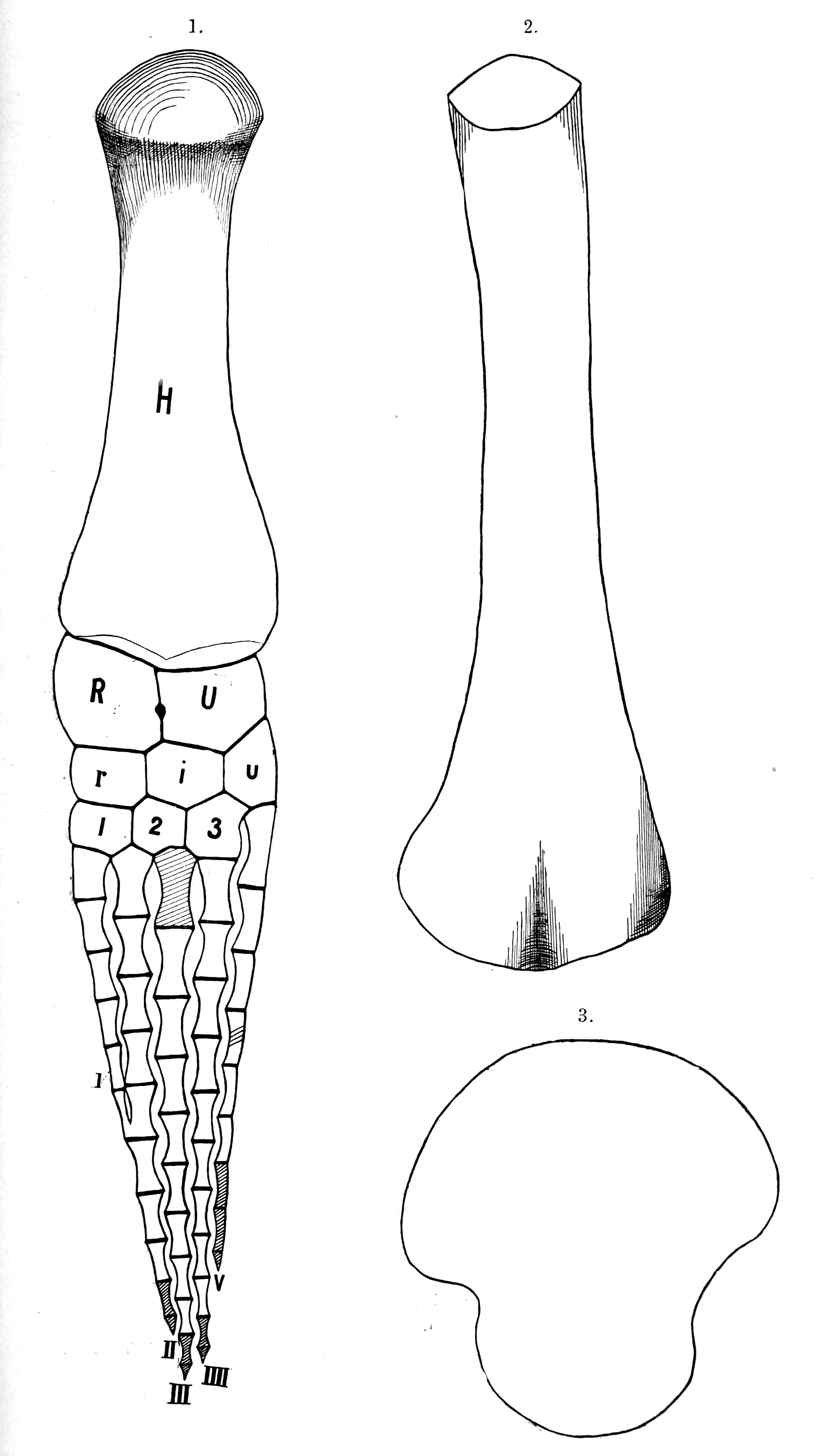
- 1898 illustrations by Wilbur Clinton Knight of some of the holotype fossils

Scientific classification
- Kingdom: Animalia
- Phylum: Chordata
- Class: Reptilia
- Superorder: †Sauropterygia
- Order: †Plesiosauria
- Suborder: †Pliosauroidea
- Family: †Pliosauridae
- Clade: †Thalassophonea
- Genus: †Megalneusaurus; Knight, 1898

Type species
- Megalneusaurus rex (Knight, 1895) [originally Cimoliosaurus]

Synonyms
- Cimoliosaurus rex Knight, 1895

= Megalneusaurus =

Megalneusaurus Temporal range: Late Jurassic (Oxfordian to Kimmeridgian), 163.5–152.1 Ma

Extinct genus of marines reptiles

Megalneusaurus is a genus of large pliosaurid plesiosaur from the Late Jurassic of North America. It was provisionally described as a species of Cimoliosaurus by the geologist Wilbur Clinton Knight in 1895, before being given its own genus by the same author in 1898. The only known species is M. rex, known from several specimens mainly found in the Redwater Shale Member, within the Sundance Formation, Wyoming, United States. A specimen discovered in the Naknek Formation in southern Alaska was referred to the genus in 1994. The loss of most fossils has led some paleontologists to consider the genus as dubious, although its validity is maintained by many authors. The binominal name literally means "king of large swimming lizards", due to the size of the first specimen.

Estimated to be around 7–9 meters (23–30 ft) long, Megalneusaurus is one of the largest known North American pliosaurs. As its name suggests, the genus was considered the largest sauropterygian identified before the discovery of some Kronosaurus fossils in 1930. Like some other plesiosaurs, Megalneusaurus have four flippers, a short tail, and most likely an elongated head and short neck, suggesting that it is a thalassophonean-like pliosaurid. The rear flippers were larger than those at the front.

The animal lived in the shallow waters of the Sundance Sea, an epicontinental sea covering much of North America during part of the Jurassic. Like other plesiosaurs, Megalneusaurus was well-adapted to aquatic life, using its flippers for a method of swimming known as subaqueous flight. It shared its habitat with invertebrates, fish, ichthyosaurs, and other plesiosaurs, including the cryptoclidids Pantosaurus and Tatenectes. Based on stomach contents, the animal fed on cephalopods and fish, although it could also have fed on contemporary plesiosaurs. The Alaskan specimen also indicates that it would have occupied colder waters, where the fauna was less diverse.

== Research history ==
In 1895, geologist Wilbur Clinton Knight went to examine an oil field near the small town of Ervay, Wyoming, USA. The renowned paleontologist Edward Drinker Cope was originally supposed to accompany Knight on this examination, but instead, he sent an individual named Stewart, who worked for him at the American Museum of Natural History. They spent about thirty days together doing their work, but after that, Knight, wanting to go home, left Stewart in another field with other two men. On his way back, while re-examining the oil field, Knight discovered the partially articulated but incomplete fossilized skeleton of a large pliosaur. Lacking the materials to exhume the specimen, he contacted a rancher living nearby who lent him tools and a wagon. The lack of packing materials, however, led Knight to rebury much of the fossil specimen, intending to return to continue his work later. While the geologist was away from the discovery site, Stewart arrived nearby and was quickly informed about the finding by the rancher who had lent his colleague the tools. Stewart then recovered most of the reburied fossils and sent them to the American Museum of Natural History, urging his two colleagues he had previously met to help him with this task. Describing this action as theft, Knight sent two letters in 1898, addressed respectively to the museum director Henry Fairfield Osborn and J. M. Garett, requesting the return of the pliosaur and shark fossils residing in Cope's collection at the museum, which were originally discovered by him.

The fossils of the pliosaur first unearthed by Knight have since been sent to the University of Wyoming, where they are catalogued as UW 4602. These consist of ribs, vertebrae, two more or less partial flippers and part of the shoulder girdle, from an adult specimen. Knight made his discovery official the same year via an announcement that was published by Science, where he briefly described certain fossils. As the fossils were not exhumed from their geological matrix at the time of publication, Knight was uncertain about what genus the specimen pertained to. He therefore named a new species of Cimoliosaurus, C. rex, to which he provisionally classified it pending a more in-depth description. It was three years later, in 1898, that Knight described the specimen in more detail and named the distinct genus Megalneusaurus to include it, the species thus becoming M. rex. The generic name is formed from the Ancient Greek words μέγας (mégas, "great") and νηκτός (nêktós, "swimmer") prefixed onto σαῦρος (saûros, "lizard"), while the specific name rex means "king" in Latin. Combined, the binominal name literally means "king of large swimming lizards". Although no description of the meaning of this etymology was given in Knight's 1898 description, it was named for its size, which was considerable for plesiosaurians then known, which he judged to be "the largest known animal of the order Sauropterygia".

Localities from where Megalneusaurus fossils have been discovered. The red point shows the location of the type locality of the taxon, while the gray point shows that of the referred specimen.

Due to the discovery of other large pliosaurs found elsewhere in the world, Megalneusaurus was mostly ignored by paleontologists, being only very briefly mentioned in 20th and early 21st century scientific literature. Furthermore, additional parts of the holotype including cervical, dorsal and caudal vertebrae, a large part of the shoulder girdle and ribs, have also been lost. It was nevertheless reported in 2003 by the biologist Richard Ellis that the paleontologist Robert Bakker was re-examining the remaining fossil material with the aim of giving an updated and more detailed description. In 1995, the Tate Geological Museum of Casper, Wyoming, planned to create an exhibit showcasing marine reptiles discovered in the Sundance Formation. During the preparations for the exhibit, researchers came across a cast of one the original flippers discovered by Knight. Based on this same casting, American paleontologist William Wahl of the Wyoming Dinosaur Center, began to take a particular interest in this taxon, which led him to open an investigation to find the location of the original type locality of Megalneusaurus. It was during the summer of 1996 that the type locality was finally found, thanks among other things to letters and especially a map drawn by Knight in 1901. The site is located at the Redwater Shale Member of the upper part of the Sundance Formation, which dates to the Oxfordian stage of the Late Jurassic. After this rediscovery, new excavations were launched in the field and additional fossils were found. About 20 m (66 ft) from the area where the first known fossils of Megalneusaurus were discovered, a large bone fragment probably coming from the shoulder or pelvic girdle was exhumed and mentioned in a 2007 article. In 2008 a fully articulated and almost complete forelimb from the holotype specimen was exhumed, and it was described in detail in 2010. From the orientation of this forelimb, it is likely that the humerus, or part of it, was on or near the ground surface and could have been collected in 1895 by either Knight or Stewart. Fossils coming possibly from two other specimens of Megalneusaurus have also been reported. The first is an isolated neural arch (top/dorsal part of the vertebra), cataloged as UW 24238, while the second is a propodial (upper limb bone), cataloged as WDC SS019. Other fossil finds referred to Megalneusaurus were made in this area over an additional period from 2009 until 2011, but these have not yet been officially described.

In addition to the material from Wyoming, a specimen assigned to Megalneusarus is also known from southern Alaska. In 1922, W. R. Smith of the United States Geological Survey received two bone fragments from prospector Jack Mason. These two fragments were collected from the Kejulik River, located on the Alaska Peninsula, and consist of the proximal and distal ends of the same large bone interpreted as a humerus, which was subsequently stored at the National Museum of Natural History, where it is since cataloged as USNM 418489. The stratigraphic unit in which this specimen was discovered corresponds to the Snug Harbor Siltstone Member of the Naknek Formation, dating from between the Oxfordian and Kimmeridgian stages of the Late Jurassic. It was only in 1994 that American paleontologists Robert E. Weems and Robert B. Blodgett described this fossil in detail, referring it to the genus on the basis of comparisons made with the holotype specimen. However, as their description and comparison is only based on an isolated bone, they referred it under the name Megalneusaurus sp., the authors being uncertain as to whether the specimen belonged to M. rex or another species. Although some authors have been doubtful about the attribution of this specimen to the genus in later works, Wahl and colleagues reclassified this specimen as an M. rex in 2010, but considered the bone to be a partial propodial.

== Description ==
Plesiosaurs are usually categorized as belonging to the small-headed, long-necked "plesiosauromorph" morphotype or the large-headed, short-necked "pliosauromorph" morphotype, Megalneusaurus belonging to the latter category. Like all plesiosaurs, it had a short tail, a massive trunk and two pairs of large flippers.

=== Size ===
Megalneusaurus is one the largest pliosaurid taxa ever identified in North America, being nevertheless smaller than the Mexican "Monster of Aramberri" and comparable in size with the Late Cretaceous related genus Megacephalosaurus. Megalneusaurus was even considered to be the largest known pliosaur in the world until some fossils of the Australian pliosaurid Kronosaurus were described in 1930. Several estimates of the size of Megalneusaurus have been given. In 2006, Wahl gave the animal a length of approximately 13 m (43 ft), before the same author and his colleagues reduced its size to 10 m (33 ft) the following year. In his 2009 thesis, Australian paleontologist Colin McHenry estimated the size of the animal at between 10 and 12 m (33 and 39 ft) long based on measurements of the femora given by Knight in 1898. However, most recent estimates reduce the size of Megalneusaurus to between 7.6 and 9.2 m (25 and 30 ft) long. Based on a skeleton preserved in the Museum of Comparative Zoology of Harvard attributed to Kronosaurus, Bakker suggested in 2003 that the animal would have had a skull measuring 3.3 m (11 ft) long, although the relevant material is not known. In 2024, Chinese paleontologist Ruizhe Jackevan Zhao suggested that Megalneusaurus would have been similar in size to Pliosaurus funkei, which according to his model was approximately 9.8 m (32 ft) long with a body mass of 12 t (12 long tons; 13 short tons). The referred specimen from Alaska is smaller in measurement than the holotype specimen, although no estimate of its size has been given.

=== Postcranial skeleton ===
The majority of the anatomy of Megalneusaurus is only known from the holotype specimen, which preserves only the postcranial parts of the animal. Furthermore, Knight described the now-lost parts of the holotype skeleton in 1898. According to him, the centra (vertebral bodies) of Megalneusaurus are two-thirds as long as wide, although their morphology varies considerably. The anterior cervical vertebrae (neck vertebrae) have a cupped anterior surface and a slightly concave posterior surface, having sutured neural arches. The dorsal vertebrae are cylindrical in shape, overhanging forward from their upper part, their neural spines being low and crest-like. The caudal vertebrae have surfaces that are slightly concave. The coracoids are long and wide, being drawn out at the glenoid fossa of the scapula.

When Knight reported the discovery of the holotype specimen in 1895, he initially identified the flippers as hind limbs. However, in his more detailed description published three years later, he reidentified them as forelimbs. The discovery of the third flipper in 2008, however, confirms that the first identification was correct (as previously suggested by McHenry), as it was 15% smaller than those first discovered. This also confirms that Megalneusaurus has longer hind limbs than forelimbs, like other pliosaurids. The anterior flippers have phalanges that are hourglass-shaped, while those at the back are flattened. The humerus would have been smaller than the femur, with estimates suggesting that the bone would have reached only 85% of the latter's length. The tibia has a bony projection that articulates with a depression present in the fibula. According to Wahl, this anatomical configuration is not unlike that of a Peloneustes specimen. The metacarpals, metatarsals, and phalanges tend to vary in cross-section. Although the number of phalanges in each digit is mainly unknown in both the fore- and hind limbs, the first manual digit appears to have five.

== Classification and validity ==
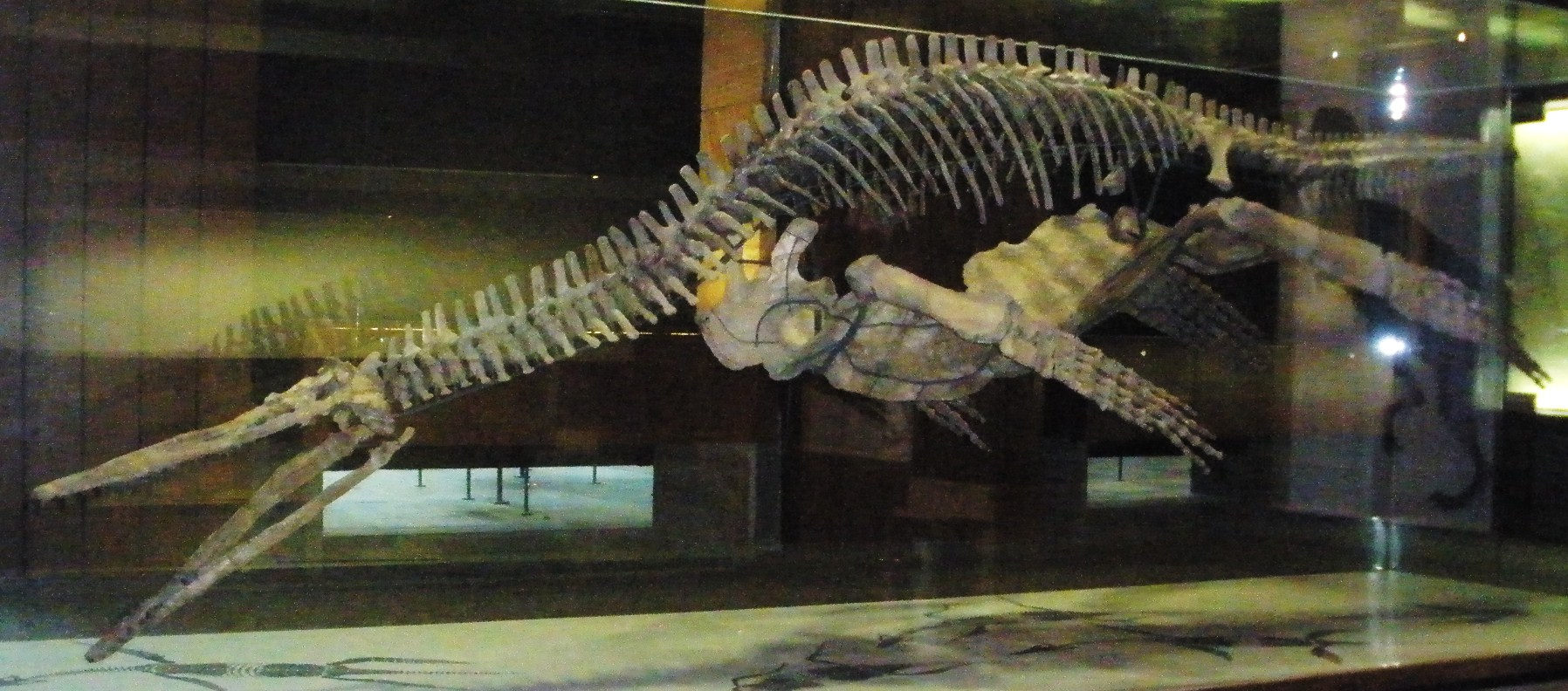
Mounted skeleton of the thalassophonean Peloneustes, a small pliosaurid closely related to Megalneusaurus

Because the fossils were incompletely prepared in 1895, Knight initially made a tentative assignment to the genus Cimoliosaurus, a plesiosauroid currently classified in the family Elasmosauridae. However, the same author concluded that the fossils belonged to a pliosaur in 1898, comparing it to the pliosaurids Pliosaurus and Peloneustes, although he also noted the anatomical resemblance with the plesiosaurid Plesiosaurus. Studies published from the second half of the 20th century agree that Megalneusaurus was most likely a pliosaurid.

In 2003, Ellis mentioned that many researchers doubted the diagnostic nature of the holotype specimen due to the loss of the previously mentioned fossils, although he also points out that some are of the opposite opinion. This explains why the name Megalneusaurus is still preserved in some later studies. In 2013, British paleontologist Roger B. J. Benson and his American colleague Patrick S. Druckenmiller named a new clade within Pliosauridae, Thalassophonea. This clade included the "classic", short-necked pliosaurids while excluding the earlier, long-necked, more gracile forms. Although no study addressing its phylogenetic position has yet been published, Megalneusaurus has since been seen as a large representative.

== Paleobiology ==
=== Mobility ===
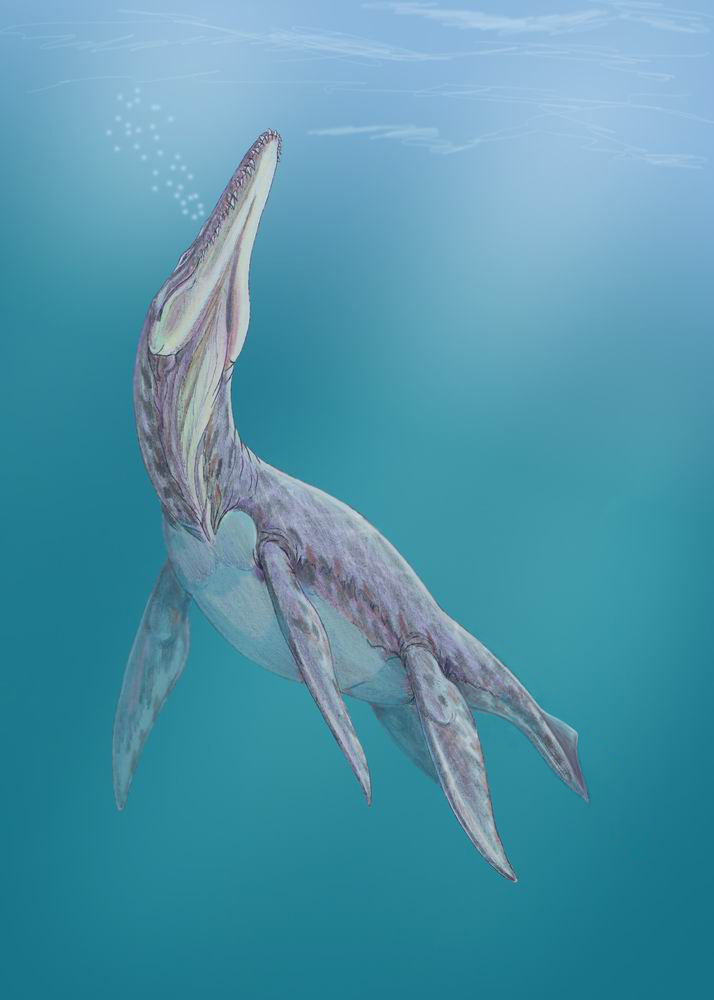
Hypothetical life restoration based on related genera

Plesiosaurs such as Megalneusaurus employed a method of swimming known as subaqueous flight, using their flippers as hydrofoils. Plesiosaurs are unusual among marine reptiles in that they used all four of their limbs, but not movements of the vertebral column, for propulsion. The short tail, while unlikely to have been used to propel the animal, could have helped stabilise or steer the plesiosaur. In 2010, Wahl and colleagues proposed that the rear flippers of the holotype specimen have aspect ratios of 8.0, while the front flippers would have aspect ratios of at least 8.2. These ratios, surpassing those of other pliosauromorphs, seem to indicate that Megalneusaurus would probably have been able to move quickly and nimbly, albeit inefficiently, in order to capture prey. In a 2022 study, computer modelling found that due to their large flippers, a plesiosaur would have produced more drag than a comparably-sized cetacean or ichthyosaur. However, plesiosaurs counteracted this with their large trunks and body size.

=== Feeding ===
The stomach contents of the holotype specimen of M. rex contain numerous hooklets of coleoid cephalopods as well as few fragments of fish bones. Similar stomach contents have also been documented in other contemporary plesiosaurs, such as Tatenectes and Pantosaurus, proving that these were common food sources for marine reptiles of the Sundance Formation. Being a large pliosaurid, Megalneusaurus would likely have fed on other contemporary plesiosaurs, particularly juveniles or subadults. A juvenile plesiosaur fossil identified in this formation also shows bite marks on the bones of one of its flippers, although their origins have not been determined. While not as maneuverable as other contemporary marine reptiles, Megalneusaurus would likely have been an ambush predator to catch larger prey. Despite the lack of direct evidence of interactions, Megalneusaurus is interpreted as an opportunistic apex predator in the Sundance Formation according to Judy A. Massare and colleagues in 2014.

=== Paleopathology ===
According to Bruce M. Rothschild and Glenn W. Storrs in 2003, the hind limbs of the M. rex holotype specimen are affected by avascular necrosis. (Note: The study reporting this reports them as humeri based on their misidentification after Knight (1898).) A large number of other more or less related plesiosaur fossils also show this disease in both the humerus and the femur. This is the result of ascending too quickly after a deep diving. It is uncertain how deep the animal would have descended, as the avascular necrosis could have been caused by a few very deep dives or by a large number of relatively shallow descents. The vertebrae, however, do not show such damage, being, during the lifetime of the plesiosaur, probably protected by a superior blood supply, made possible by the arteries penetrating each vertebra through the two foramina subcentralia, large openings in their lower face.

== Paleoecology ==
=== Wyoming ===
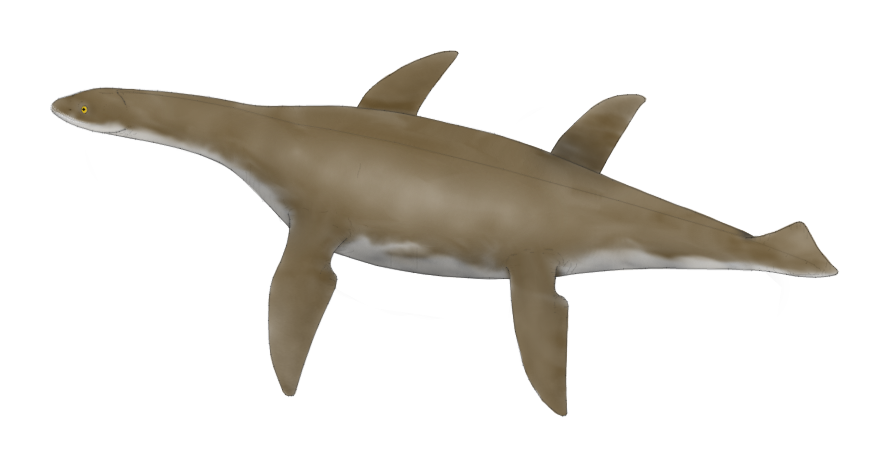
Life restoration of Tatenectes, a contemporary plesiosaur from the Sundance Formation.

Megalneusaurus comes from the Oxfordian-aged (Upper Jurassic) rocks of the Redwater Shale Member of the Sundance Formation. This member is about 30–60 meters (98–197 ft) thick. While mainly composed of grayish green shale, it also has layers of yellow limestone and sandstone, the former layers containing plentiful fossils of marine life. The Sundance Formation was deposited in a shallow epicontinental sea known as the Sundance Sea. From the Yukon and Northwest Territories of Canada, where it was connected to the open ocean, this sea spanned inland southwards to New Mexico and eastward to the Dakotas. When Megalneusaurus was alive, most of the Sundance Sea was less than 40 meters (130 ft) deep. Based on δ^{18}O isotope ratios in belemnite fossils, the temperature in the Sundance Sea would have been 13–17 °C (55–63 °F) below and 16–20 °C (61–68 °F) above the thermocline.

The paleobiota of the Sundance Formation includes foraminiferans and algae, in addition to a variety of animals. Many invertebrates are known, represented by crinoids, echinoids, serpulid worms, ostracods, malacostracans, and mollusks. The mollusks include cephalopods such as ammonites and belemnites, bivalves such as oysters and scallops, and gastropods. Fish from the formation are represented by hybodont and neoselachian chondrichthyans as well as teleosts (including Pholidophorus). Marine reptiles are uncommon, but are represented by four species. Of all the plesiosaurs, Megalneusaurus is the only pliosaurid identified in the Sundance Formation. The other plesiosaurs known from this formation are the cryptoclidids Tatenectes and Pantosaurus. Besides plesiosaurs, marine reptiles are also represented by the ichthyosaur Ophthalmosaurus (or, possibly, Baptanodon) natans, the most abundant marine reptile of the Sundance Formation.

=== Alaska ===
The Alaskan specimen of Megalneusaurus likely originates from Oxfordian to Kimmeridgian rocks of the Snug Harbor Siltstone Member of the Naknek Formation. When the specimen was alive, this region was located at a paleolatitude of more than 60°N, making the area a boreal environment. The sparse limestone sediments and the few mollusk fossils in the Naknek Formation indicate that the peninsular terrane (crust fragment formed on a tectonic plate) from which the specimen originates was located in colder waters than in the Sundance Formation. The Naknek Formation also has a less diverse invertebrate fauna than the Sundance Formation, being mainly represented by mollusks. These include bivalves and cephalopods of the ammonite and belemnite groups. The paleobiota of this unit also includes foraminifera, radiolarians, and fish.

== See also ==
- List of plesiosaur genera
- Timeline of plesiosaur research
