= Sundance Sea =

Jurassic inland sea

The Sundance Sea was an epeiric sea that existed in North America during the mid-to-late Jurassic Period of the Mesozoic Era. It was an arm of what is now the Arctic Ocean, and extended through what is now western Canada into the central western United States. The sea receded when highlands to the west began to rise.

== Stratigraphy ==
The Sundance Sea did not occur at a single time; geological evidence suggests that the Sea was actually a series of five successive marine transgressions—each separated by an erosional hiatus—which advanced and receded from the middle Jurassic onward. The terrestrial sediments of the Morrison Formation—eroded from rising highlands to the west—were deposited on top of the marine Sundance sediments as the sea regressed for the last time late in the Jurassic.

== Fauna ==
The Sundance Sea was rich in many types of animals. Gryphaea was extremely common, and shark teeth have been found. In addition to fish, belemnites and to an extent ammonites have been found in sediments from the Sundance Sea. Crinoids and bivalves would have dotted the seafloor. Baptanodon, a large 20-foot (6 m) long ichthyosaur, swam in the seas using its large, long jaws to catch belemnite 'squid'. Pantosaurus, a 15–20 foot (4.5–6 m) long cryptoclidid plesiosaur, went after the easier-to-catch fish. The largest marine reptile in the Sundance Sea was Megalneusaurus, a 25-foot (8 m) long pliosaur similar to Liopleurodon. Its fossils have been found in Alaska and Wyoming, which were both covered by the Sundance Sea when it was alive.

During the periods of recession, dinosaurs and other Jurassic terrestrial animals frequented the shores, as evidenced by the Red Gulch Dinosaur Tracksite near Shell, Wyoming.

== See also ==
- Western Interior Seaway – Prehistoric inland sea that split the continent of North America
- Turgai Sea – Large shallow body of salt water of the Mesozoic and Cenozoic Eras
