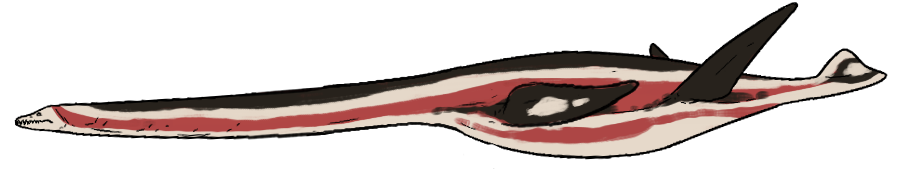
- Life restoration

Scientific classification
- Domain: Eukaryota
- Kingdom: Animalia
- Phylum: Chordata
- Class: Reptilia
- Superorder: †Sauropterygia
- Order: †Plesiosauria
- Family: †Cryptoclididae
- Genus: †Spitrasaurus; Knutsen, Druckenmiller & Hurum, 2012

Species
- †S. wensaasi Knutsen, Druckenmiller & Hurum, 2012 (type); †S. larseni Knutsen, Druckenmiller & Hurum, 2012

= Spitrasaurus =

Spitrasaurus Temporal range: Tithonian ~150–145 Ma

Extinct genus of reptiles

Spitrasaurus is an extinct genus of cryptoclidid plesiosauroid plesiosaur known from the uppermost Jurassic of central Spitsbergen, Norway and likely also Kimmeridge, England. It is named after a syllabic abbreviation for Spitsbergen Travel. Two species have been named: Spitrasaurus wensaasi, honouring volunteer Tommy Wensås, and Spitrasaurus larseni honouring volunteer Stig Larsen.

The holotype, found in 2004, of S. wensaasi is PMO 219 718 and consists of sixty articulated cervical vertebrae and other postcranial material from a juvenile, and the holotype of S. larseni, found in 2010, is SVB 1450, a juvenile skeleton which consists of cervical vertebrae but also of skull material.

A cervical vertebra, MANCH LL 5519c, was found in the Kimmeridge Clay Formation in England and was tentatively assigned to cf. Spitrasaurus in 2014 after being compared to Colymbosaurus megadeirus, while more possible Spitrasaurus vertebrae found at Kimmeridge reside within the collection of Steve Etches.

== See also ==
- List of plesiosaur genera
- Timeline of plesiosaur research
