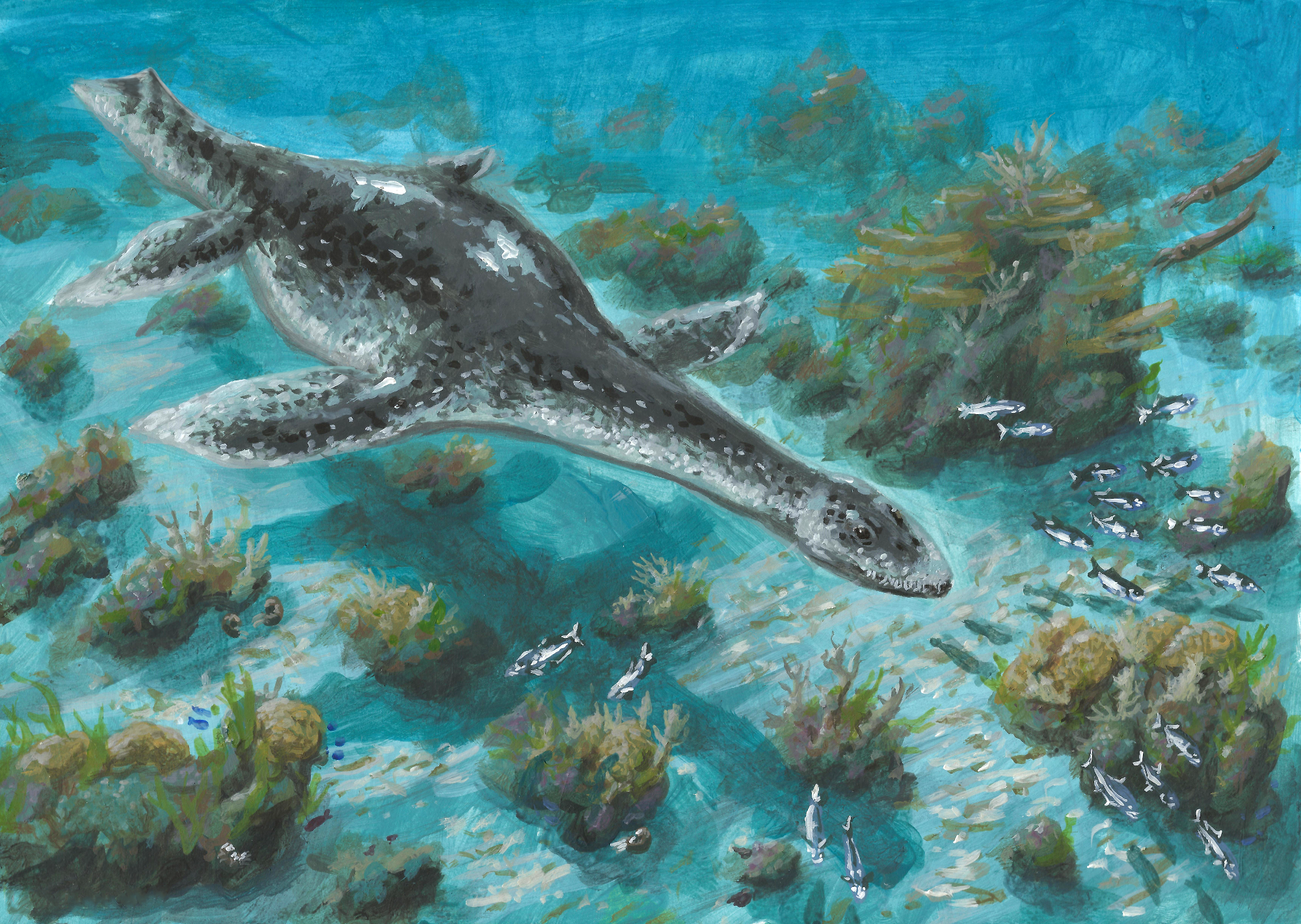
- Restoration

Scientific classification
- Kingdom: Animalia
- Phylum: Chordata
- Class: Reptilia
- Superorder: †Sauropterygia
- Order: †Plesiosauria
- Superfamily: †Plesiosauroidea
- Family: †Cryptoclididae
- Subfamily: †Cryptoclidinae
- Genus: †Kimmerosaurus; Brown, 1981
- Species: †K. langhami

Binomial name
- †Kimmerosaurus langhami Brown, 1981

= Kimmerosaurus =

Kimmerosaurus Temporal range: Late Jurassic, ~152–147 Ma

Extinct genus of plesiosaur

Kimmerosaurus ("lizard from Kimmeridge") is an extinct genus of plesiosaur from the family Cryptoclididae. It is known from remains found in England and Norway.

== Discovery and naming ==
There are very few fossil remains of Kimmerosaurus known. In fact, nothing has been found to show what Kimmerosaurus may have looked like below the neck, although the atlas and the axis are similar to those of the plesiosaur Colymbosaurus. It is this lack of any post-cranial fossils, and the bone similarities that has led to the belief that Kimmerosaurus fossils could be the missing head of Colymbosaurus, a similar plesiosaur with no known skull fossils.

The first part of the genus name of Kimmerosaurus comes from the location of the first Kimmerosaurus fossils, Kimmeridge Clay deposits of Dorset, England (these deposits are also the root word for the Kimmeridgian stage of the Jurassic period). The second part comes from the Greek word σαυρος (sauros), "lizard".

=== Known specimens ===
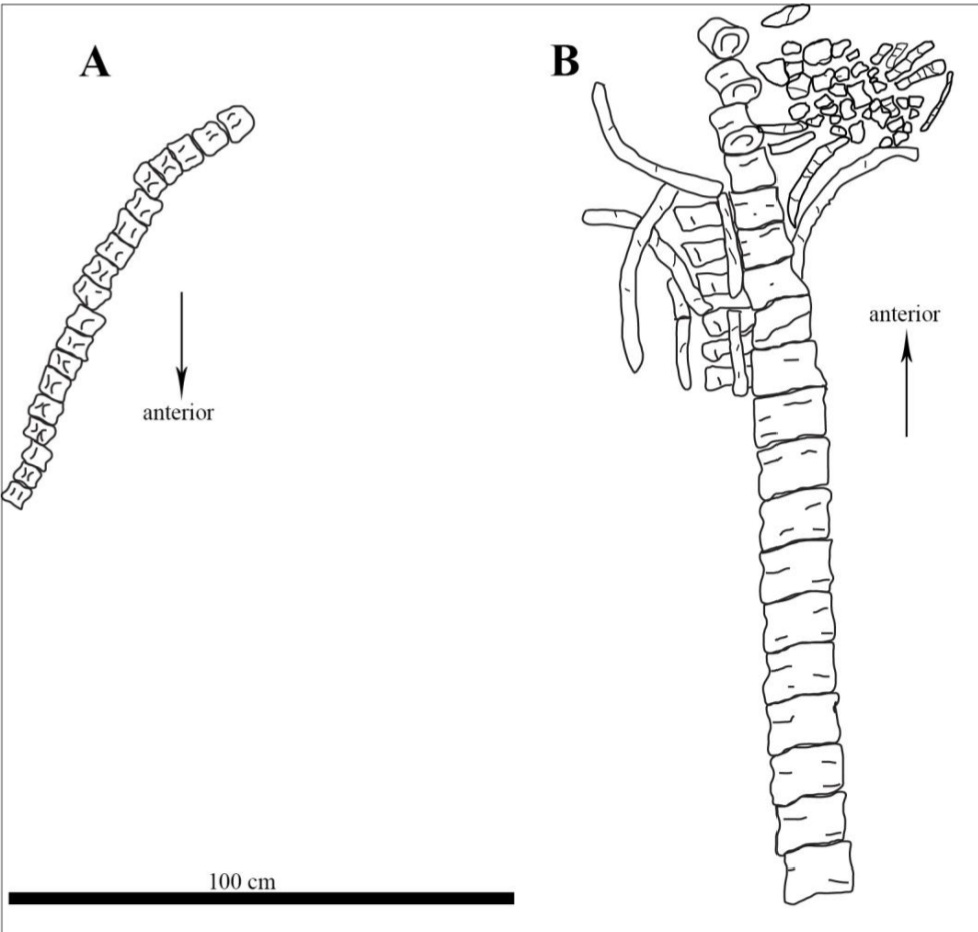
Specimen PMO 212.662 (cf. Kimmerosaurus)

==== London specimens ====
The holotype is NHMUK R.8431, a partial skull previously referred to Cryptoclidus eurymerus. It was discovered alongside the second specimen by Peter Langham at Endcome Bay, Dorset in 1976 and was named as Kimmerosaurus langhami by Brown (1981b).

NHMUK PV R 10042, a skull and five cervical vertebrae, was also discovered in 1976 by Peter Langham, while BNMH R.1978 was discovered in Weymouth by R. Damon around 1884 before it was donated to the British Museum in 1890; both specimens were assigned to Kimmerosaurus in 1986.

==== Etches Collection specimens ====
The Etches Collection contains four Kimmerosaurus specimens.

EC K873, a left dentary assigned to Kimmerosaurus in 1999 was discovered on 2 December 1990 and is part of the Etches Collection. Two isolated teeth, EC K1796 and EC K2797 were discovered on 8 February 2008 and 1 March 2022 respectively before being assigned to Kimmerosaurus.

A more complete Kimmerosaurus specimen from the Etches Collection, EC K2134 (consisting of the skull roof, brain case, dentary, teeth, hyoid, and vertebrae), was discovered on 7 March 2015 and was assigned to the genus by Roberts et al. (2025). It was both the most complete and youngest known specimen of K. langhami, dating to 147 Ma.

==== Possible Norwegian specimens ====
Three more potential specimens, including mainly postcranial material, of Kimmerosaurus were excavated in the Agardhfjellet Formation, Svalbard in 1994 and between 2004 and 2009. One specimen, PMO 212.662 was described by Stokke (2022) as belonging to cf. Kimmerosaurus.

== Description ==
For decades Kimmerosaurus was known from only a skull (and a few cervical vertebrae). Because of this, much of the plesiosaur's description came from its teeth, which are recurved and buccolingually compressed (compressed cheek-side to tongue-side). The premaxilla has only eight teeth, while there are thirty-six teeth on each ramus. The parietals of Kimmerosaurus do not form a sagittal crest. The overall skull of Kimmerosaurus is similar to Cryptoclidus but much more broad.

== Phylogeny ==
Kimmerosaurus was placed into Cryptoclididae as the sister taxon of Cryptoclidus.

Cladogram as per Ketchum & Benson (2010):

- Cryptoclididae
  - - Muraenosaurus
    - Tricleidus
  - - Cryptoclidus
    - Kimmerosaurus

== Palaeoecology ==
Kimmerosaurus fossils are found in the Kimmeridge Clay Formation near the village of Kimmeridge, in Dorset, England. This animal may have ranged through much of what is now the Jurassic Coast, a World Heritage Site in the southern United Kingdom.

== See also ==
- List of plesiosaur genera
- Timeline of plesiosaur research
