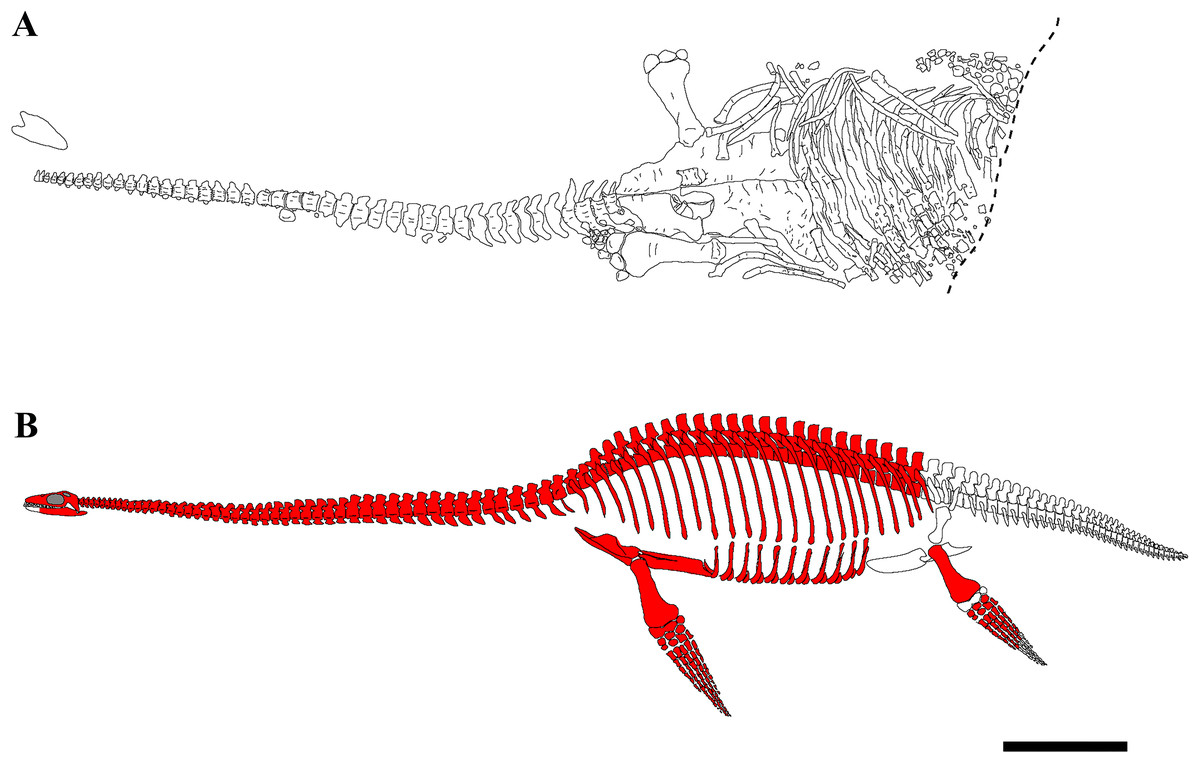
- Quarry map (A) and reconstruction (B) of holotype skeleton

Scientific classification
- Kingdom: Animalia
- Phylum: Chordata
- Class: Reptilia
- Superorder: †Sauropterygia
- Order: †Plesiosauria
- Superfamily: †Plesiosauroidea
- Family: †Cryptoclididae
- Genus: †Ophthalmothule; Roberts et al., 2020

Type species
- †Ophthalmothule cryostea Roberts et al., 2020

= Ophthalmothule =

Ophthalmothule Temporal range: Tithonian-Berriasian ~145 Ma

Extinct genus of reptiles

Ophthalmothule (meaning "eye of the north"), was a cryptoclidid plesiosaur dating to the latest Volgian (around the Jurassic-Cretaceous boundary), found in the Slottsmøya Member Lagerstätte of the Agardhfjellet Formation in Spitsbergen. The type species is O. cryostea.

== Description ==
Size comparison

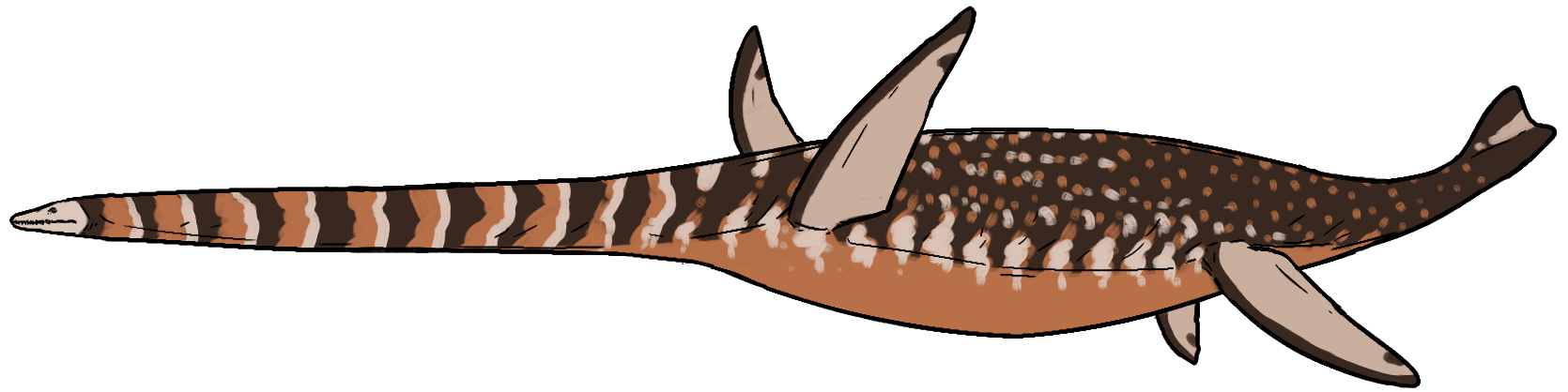
Life restoration

Ophthalmothule was a medium-sized plesiosaur, measuring 5–5.5 metres (16–18 ft) long. It was noted to have unusually large eye sockets, which suggests a paleobiological specialization, such as deep water and/or nocturnal hunting. Along with Abyssosaurus, it is one of the youngest cryptoclidids known from boreal regions. The holotype is known from skeletal material that includes a complete cranium and a partial mandible, a complete and articulated cervical vertebrae, a set of pectoral and anterior to middle dorsal series, and the pectoral girdle and anterior humeri.
