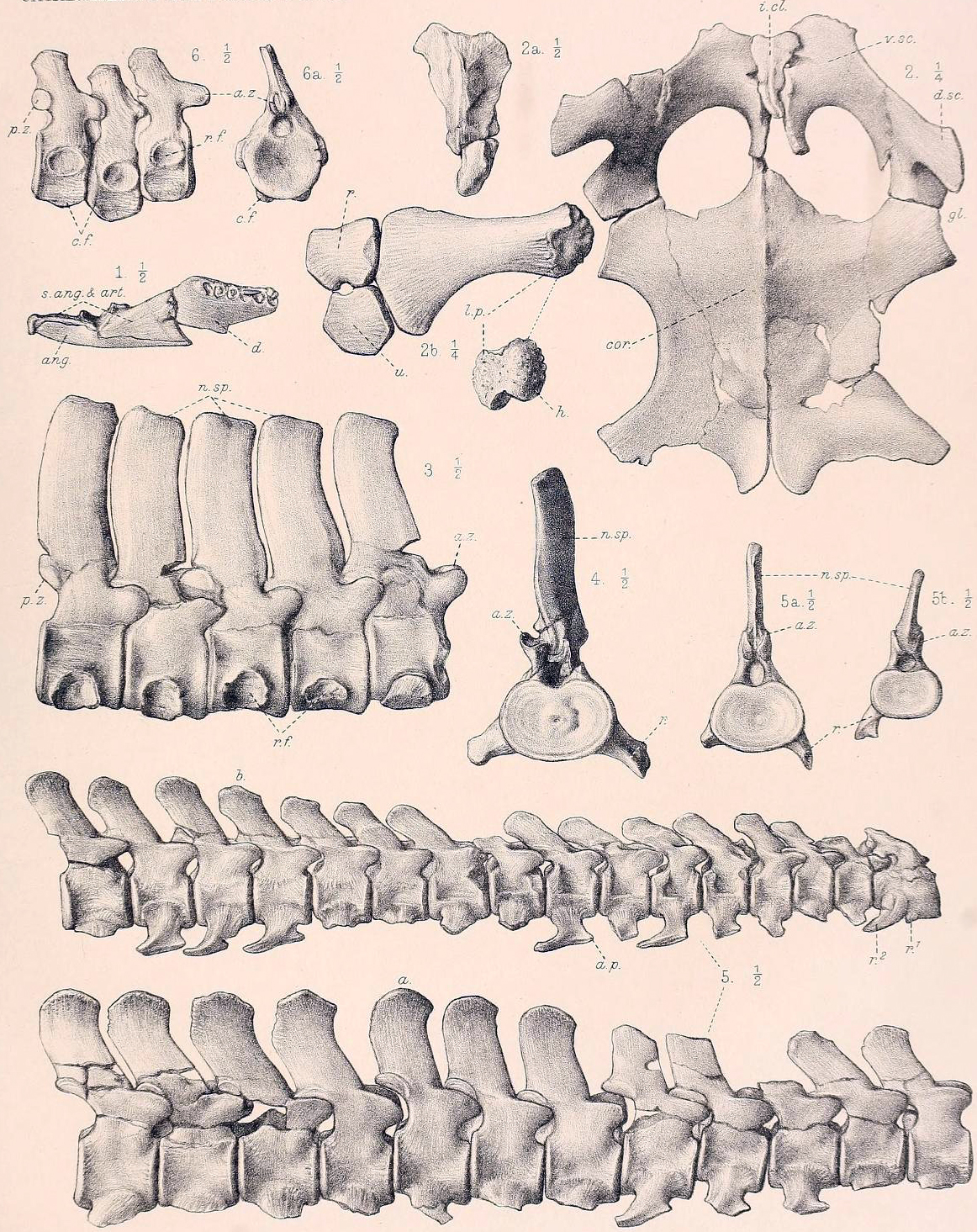
- Fossils from both specimens of P. beloclis

Scientific classification
- Kingdom: Animalia
- Phylum: Chordata
- Class: Reptilia
- Superorder: †Sauropterygia
- Order: †Plesiosauria
- Superfamily: †Plesiosauroidea
- Family: †Cryptoclididae
- Genus: †Picrocleidus; Andrews, 1910

Type species
- †Muraenosaurus beloclis Seeley, 1892

= Picrocleidus =

Picrocleidus Temporal range: Middle Jurassic, Callovian

Extinct genus of reptiles

Picrocleidus is an extinct genus of plesiosaur from the Middle Jurassic Oxford Clay Formation (Callovian stage) of the United Kingdom.

== Discovery and naming ==
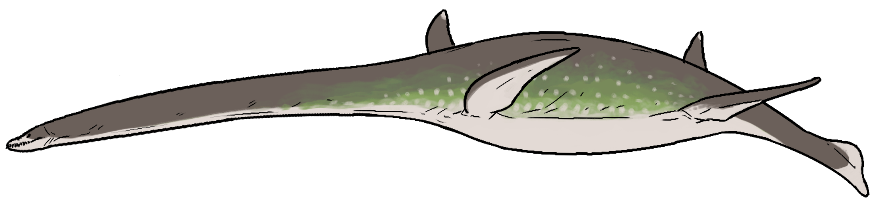
Life restoration

The holotype was discovered in the Oxford Clay Formation in Peterborough, England and acquired by Alfred Nicholson Leeds. It was initially assigned to Muraenosaurus as M. beloclis by Seeley in 1892. The specific name means "arrow clavicle", referring to the triangular interclavicula. M. beloclis was moved to its own genus Picrocleidus by Charles William Andrews in 1910. The generic name is derived from Greek pikros, "sharp", en kleis, "key", again referring to the clavicles.

Five specimens are known:

The holotype specimen BMNH R1965, a postcranial skeleton.

Specimen BMNH R3698, a skeleton with skull, including a complete tail.

Specimen BMNH R2429, an old individual consisting of anterior and posterior cervical vertebrae, pectorals and the first dorsal, some dorsal ribs, the shoulder-girdle, and the left humerus.

Specimen BMNH R2739, consisting of a basisphenoid and parasphenoid, cervical vertebrae, sacrals with the sacral ribs, an anterior caudal, some ventral ribs, both radii, odd paddle-bones, portions of ilia, ischia, and pubes.

Specimen HM 2981666: a young individual.

== Classification ==
Picrocleidus has previously been considered synonymous with Muraenosaurus although there are doubts in the relationship between the two groupings.

Picrocleidus is currently classified as a member of the Cryptoclididae.

== See also ==
- Timeline of plesiosaur research
