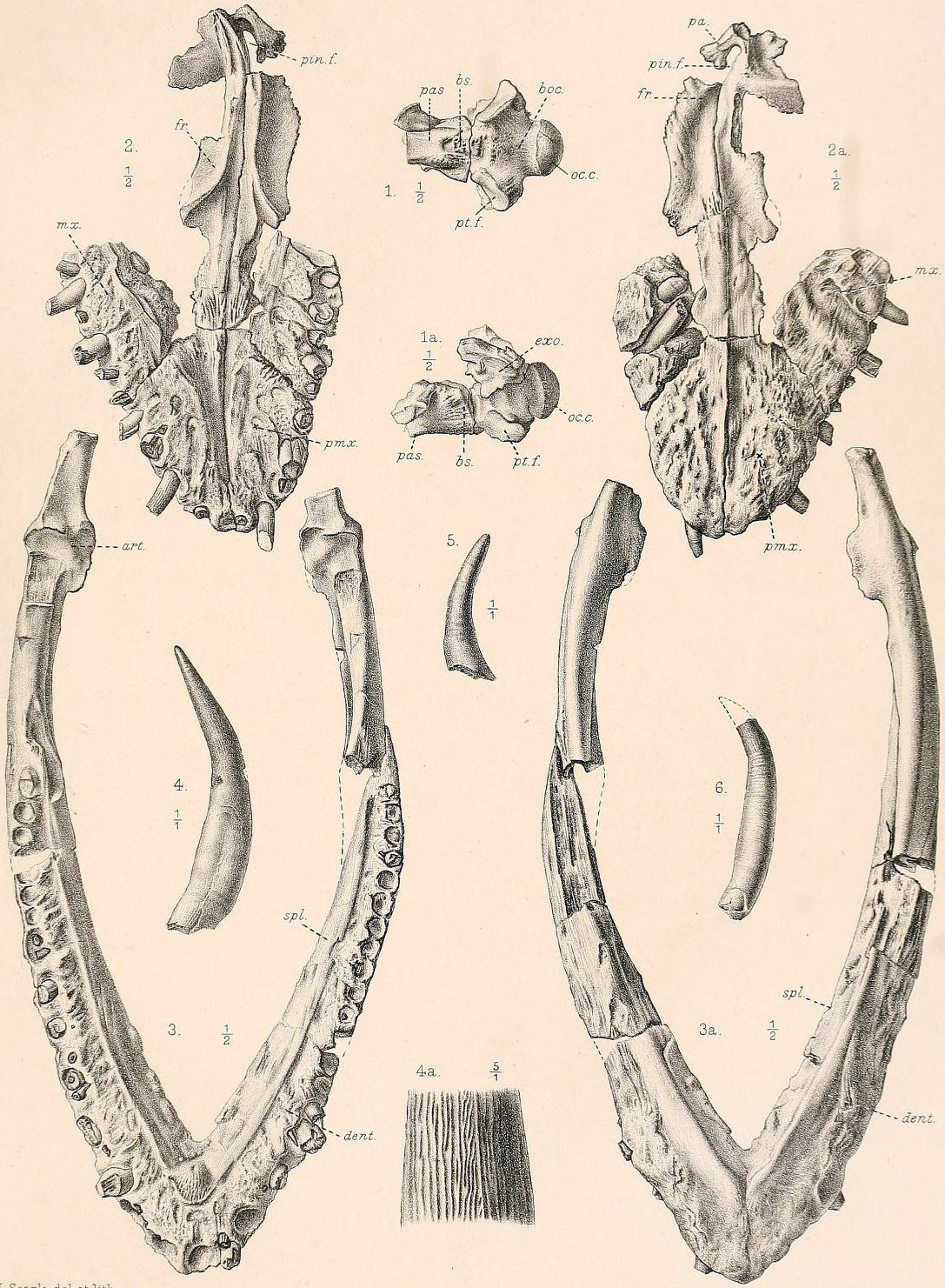
- M. leedsii fossils

Scientific classification
- Kingdom: Animalia
- Phylum: Chordata
- Class: Reptilia
- Superorder: †Sauropterygia
- Order: †Plesiosauria
- Superfamily: †Plesiosauroidea
- Family: †Cryptoclididae
- Subfamily: †Muraenosaurinae
- Genus: †Muraenosaurus; Seeley, 1874

Type species
- †Muraenosaurus leedsii Seeley, 1874

= Muraenosaurus =

Muraenosaurus Temporal range: Middle Jurassic, 164.7–163.5 Ma

Extinct genus of reptiles

Muraenosaurus (from the Latin "Muraena" meaning "eel" and "Sauros" meaning lizard) is an extinct genus of cryptoclidid plesiosaur reptile from the Oxford Clay of Southern England. The genus was given its name due to the eel-like appearance of the long neck and small head. Muraenosaurus grew up to 5.2 metres (17 ft) in length and lived roughly between 160 Ma (million years ago) and 164 Ma in the Callovian of the middle Jurassic. Charles E. Leeds collected the first Muraenosaurus which was then described by H. G. Seeley. The specimen may have suffered some damage due to the casual style of Charles Leeds’ collection. The first muraenosaur was recovered with pieces missing from the skull and many of the caudal vertebrae absent. Because the animal was described from Charles Leeds’ collection it was given the name Muraenosaurus Leedsii. M. leedsii is the most complete specimen belonging to the genus Muraenosaurus and also the only species that is undoubtedly a member of the genus. Two other species have been tentatively referred to as members of the genus Muraenosaurus: M. reedii and Muraenosaurus beloclis Seeley 1892, which in 1910 became the separate genus Picrocleidus.

Muraenosaurus reedii was discovered in Wyoming and described by Maurice Mehl of the University of Chicago. The fossilized fragments found consisted of pieces of the pectoral and pelvic girdles, several vertebrae, ribs, and a relatively complete left pectoral paddle. Connections between M. leedsii and M. reedii were drawn when examining the ribs structure and paddle of M. reedii. Both had a similarly shaped, elongated humerus and relatively short phalanges. The species M. reedii is in fact a junior synonym of Pantosaurus. Picrocleidus beloclis is another plesiosaur originating in the middle Jurassic and found in the Oxford clay formation. Picrocleidus has previously been considered synonymous with Muraenosaurus although there are doubts in the relationship between the two groupings.

== Description ==
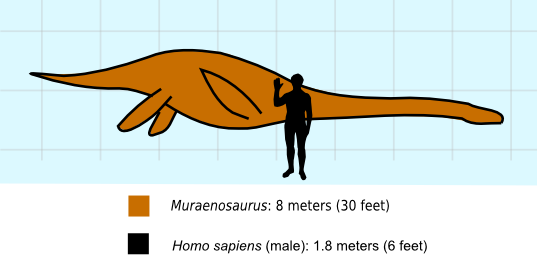
M. leedsii with a human male to scale

Muraenosaurus was a medium-sized plesiosaur, with the largest specimen measuring up to 5.2 metres (17 ft) long. The plesiosaur had 66 pre-sacral vertebrae; 44 of which were cervical. Starting from the base of the skull and moving posteriorly the cervical vertebrae elongate and the neural spines broaden. This may be indicative of increased muscle attachment towards the base of the neck. There is also a gradual flattening and reduction of the zygapohesis until about the 30th vertebra where all traces of the platform are gone. Posterior to the 44 cervical vertebrae, Muraenosaurus had 3 pectoral vertebrae and 19 thoracic vertebrae. The pectoral vertebrae resemble the terminal cervical vertebrae but display a broadened face of the centrum and a slight posterior incline in the neural spines. In the dorsal vertebrae the rib has been raised onto the neural arch. The neural spines have elongated anteroposteriorly and compressed vertically.

The pectoral girdle in Muraenosaurus is broader than in most plesiosaurs and helped to situate the animal as a member of Cryptoclididae. The coracoids reach widths of nearly 14 inches. The forelimb is compressed mediolaterally when compared to the hind limb as well as limbs of other plesiosaurs. This compression is represented in the aspect ratio of muraenosaur limbs. The aspect ratio of the hind limbs is much greater than that of the fore limbs, representing a longer and more slender form. The high aspect ratio in the forelimbs may have been used for increasing maneuverability at some cost to the animal's endurance.

== Classification ==
When Harry Seeley first described Muraenosaurus it was thought to belong to Elasmosauridae instead of Cryptoclididae. Muraenosaurs and elasmosaurs share a plesiosauromorph body type typified by having a small head at the end of a long neck. Like elasmosaurids, Muraenosaurus has a long neck. Of the 66 presacral vertebrae in Muraenosaurus, 44 of them are cervical. It was initially believed that this innovation leads to a largely flexible neck and a relatively short and sturdy body. More recent research has shown that while mobile, the neck of plesiosauromorphs was not as flexible as previously thought. The head of Muraenosaurus is also very small compared to both its neck and body length, measuring only about 37 centimetres (15 in) long. Both of these traits are common in elasmosaurids which led to the initial diagnosis of muraenosaurs in the family Elasmosauridae. However, this is actually a case of convergent evolution between cryptoclidids and elasmosaurs. The clade of cryptoclidids creates a unique tree in relation to the paleomorphology of discovered specimens. For example, within cryptocleidoidae there are short necked plesiosaurs such as Kimmerosaurus as well as the long necked Muraenosaurus. The defining features of Cryptocleidoidia include a low fin aspect ratio, a wide rounded interpterygoid vacuity, and extreme specialization of the cheek region. The interpterygoid vacuity is completely absent in elasmosaur species but well represented in cryptoclidids, including Muraenosaurus. The aspect ratio of both the fore and hind limbs of Muraenosaurus is far lower than the aspect ratio of elasmosaur specimens. The forelimbs especially resemble the flippers of Pliosauridae, an extinct group of less elongate marine reptiles that shared the seas with plesiosaurs, more than they resemble the typical plesiosaur morphology. Cryptoclidus, another cryptoclidid plesiosaurimorph, shares this trait with Muraenosaurus.

== Paleobiology ==
=== Habitat ===
Muraenosaurus was initially discovered in the Oxford Clay which represents an ancient sea that was both shallow, with an average depth less than 50 meters, and warm (20 °C). The Oxford Clay deposits are found in southern England and parts of France. The sea was abundant with nutrients and light filtered easily through the shallow water to create a highly productive ecosystem. The sea floor was littered with bivalves, arthropods, gastropods and foraminifera while the pelagic zone was home to a wide variety of species from marine reptiles to teleosts. The Oxford Clay was so productive that over 100 genera have been recovered from the sediment.

=== Diet and predation ===
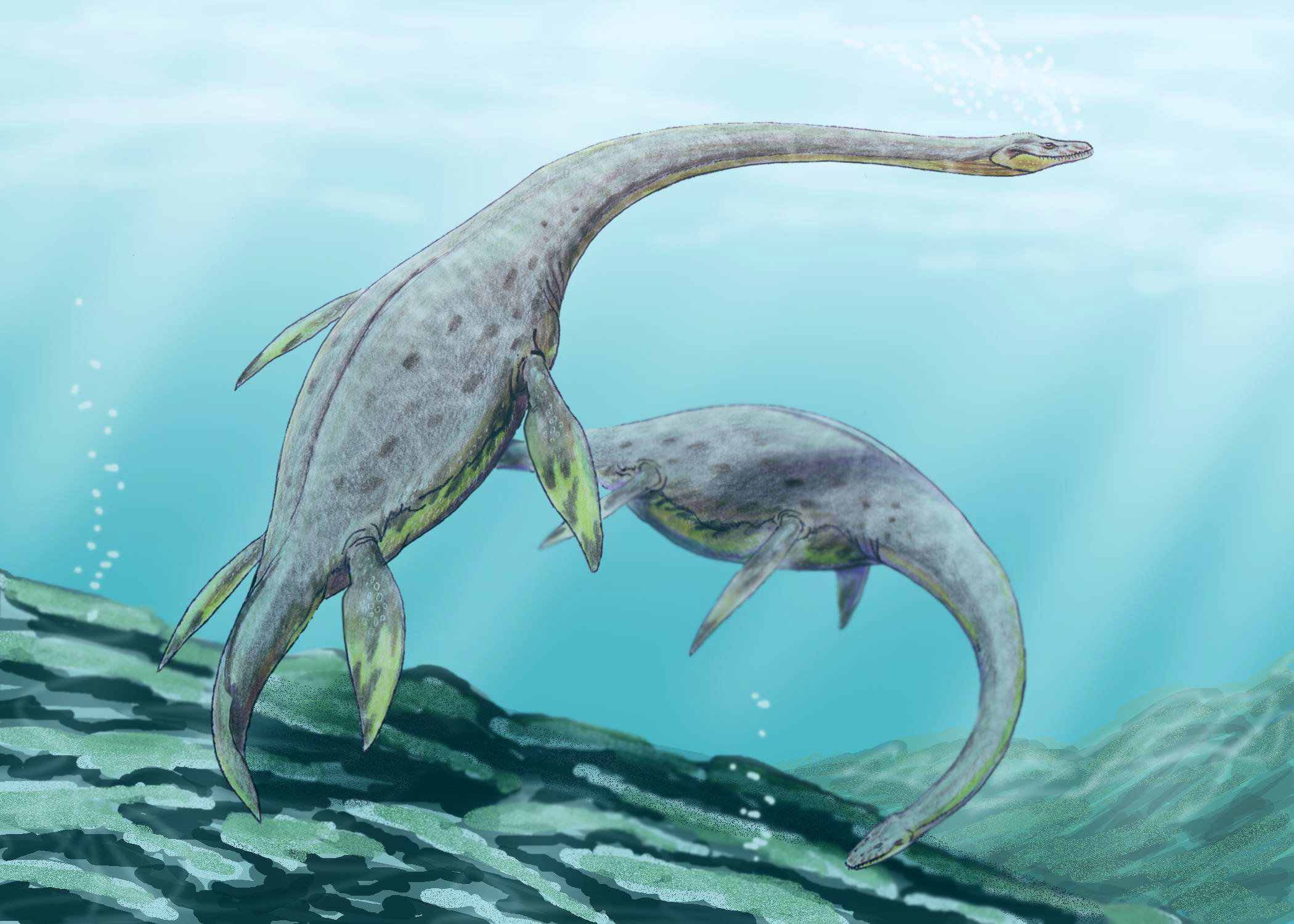
Restoration of two M. leedsii

Muraenosaurus’ role in the ecosystem is probably more comparable to elasmosaurs than other cryptoclidids due to the plesiosauromorph body plans shared between elasmosaurs and muraenosaurs. Cryptoclidids have varying morphology and it is difficult to assess their ecological role as a collective unit. Long necked plesiosaurs have been discovered with varying contents lithified within their stomachs which give some indication of what Muraenosaurus may have been eating. Preferred prey types seem to be teleost fish and cephalopods. In order to exploit such different prey species, plesiosaurs would need multiple different feeding strategies.

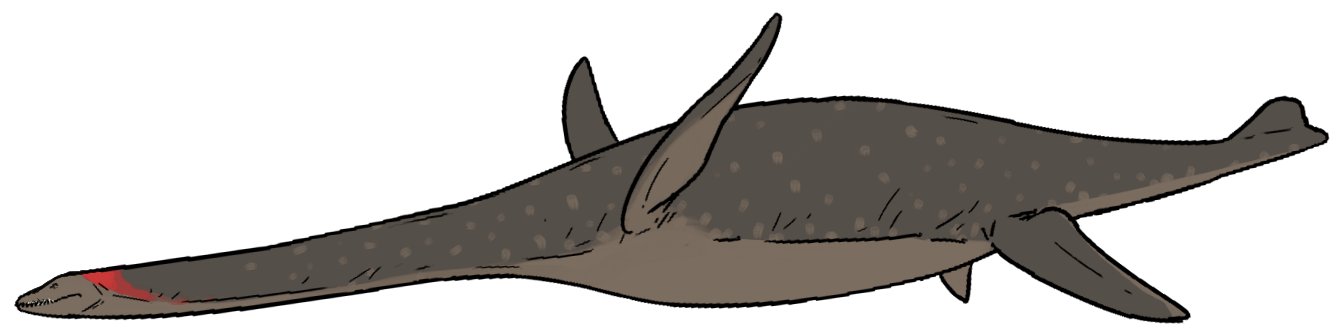
Side view of M. leedsii

Initially, long necked plesiosaurs were thought to be strictly fish eaters due to their conical teeth, a shared trait with modern piscivores. It was proposed that plesiosaurimophs would swim with a straight neck and attack pelagic fishes. The straight neck would have been used in order to avoid creating drag by arching its neck upward into the water column. Additionally, some researchers have proposed that by swimming with its head directly in front of its body, plesiosaurs would be able to reach pelagic fishes before they felt the change in water pressure caused by the large body of the plesiosaur. Essentially, the head would precede the pressure difference. It is also proposed that species like Muraenosaurus fed upon benthic fishes by floating above them and reaching its head down into the benthos. Plesiosauromorphs may also have employed a strategy called benthic grazing where they would harvest relatively immobile species such as cephalopods from the sea floor. Gastroliths have often been found within the stomachs of extinct marine reptiles and have been associated with the plesiosauromorph body type. One of the proposed uses for gastroliths is the grinding of tough, shelled foods like cephalopods.

The food chain did not stop at the plesiosaurimorphs. The oceans in the Mesozoic were dominated by pliosaurs and crocodylomorphs (such as Liopleurodon, Pliosaurus, Simolestes, and Metriorhynchus), apex predators that would have preyed upon species like Muraenosaurus.

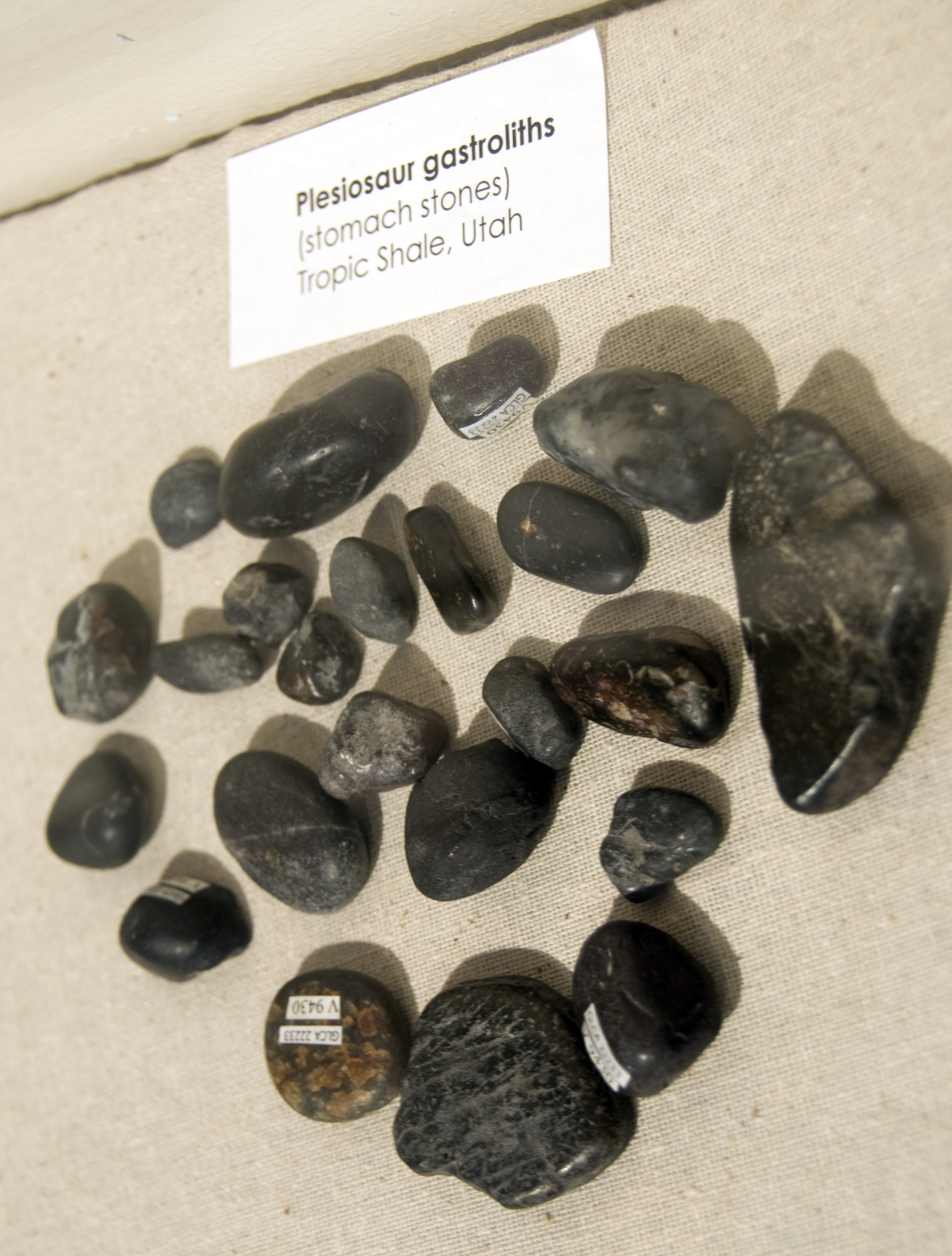
Plesiosaur gastroliths

=== Gastroliths and Buoyancy ===
Gastroliths have been a common find among the stomach contents of extinct marine reptiles. Their occurrence has led to two main hypotheses regarding the significance of the rocks. The first proposed usage, as described above, was to crush hard shelled food engulfed by the animal. The second hypothesis is that gastroliths were swallowed in order to help maintain controllable buoyancy within the water column. Modeling of Cryptoclidus body types has indicated that the use of gastroliths as ballast is unrealistic. In order to effect the animal's buoyancy, a Muraenosaur would have to consume over 10% of its body mass in stones. Observed masses of stone collected from plesiosaur stomachs are far lower than the modeled mass required to effect buoyancy. However, from the modeling a new possibility emerged and that is that gastroliths may have helped prevent rolling in animals like Muraenosaurus. Models have indicated that not only do stones reduce pivoting at depth but it is also possible they dampened the ossilations in a plesiosaur's neck, helping provide stability to counter underwater currents.

== See also ==
- List of plesiosaur genera
- Timeline of plesiosaur research
