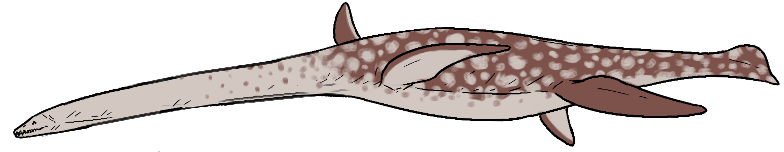
- Life restoration

Scientific classification
- Domain: Eukaryota
- Kingdom: Animalia
- Phylum: Chordata
- Class: Reptilia
- Superorder: †Sauropterygia
- Order: †Plesiosauria
- Family: †Cryptoclididae
- Genus: †Djupedalia; Knutsen, Druckenmiller & Hurum, 2012

Type species
- †Djupedalia engeri Knutsen, Druckenmiller & Hurum, 2012

= Djupedalia =

Djupedalia Temporal range: Tithonian ~150–145 Ma

Extinct genus of reptiles

Djupedalia is an extinct genus of cryptoclidid plesiosauroid plesiosaur known from the uppermost Jurassic of central Spitsbergen, Norway. It is named after Øystein Djupedal, the former Minister of Education and Research who helped fund the fossil excavation with a budget of 1.2 million Norwegian kroner.

== See also ==
- List of plesiosaur genera
- Timeline of plesiosaur research
