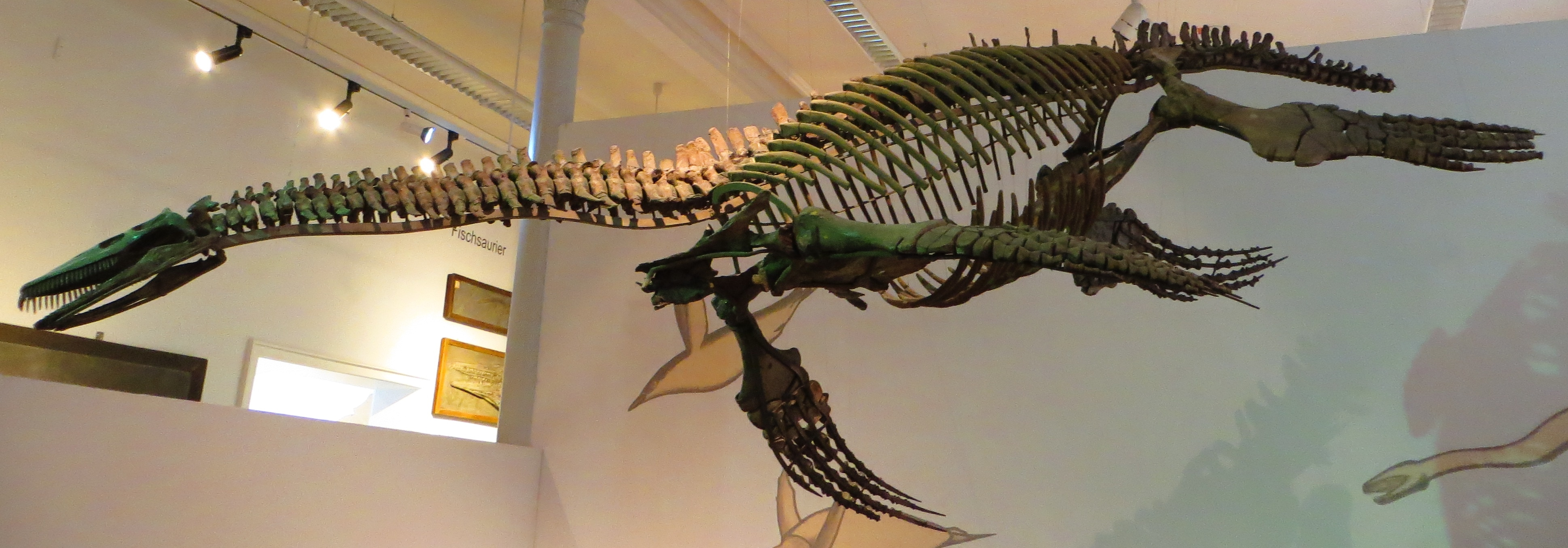
- Skeleton of Cryptoclidus eurymerus at the Museum of Paleontology, Tuebingen

Scientific classification
- Kingdom: Animalia
- Phylum: Chordata
- Class: Reptilia
- Superorder: †Sauropterygia
- Order: †Plesiosauria
- Superfamily: †Plesiosauroidea
- Clade: †Cryptoclidia
- Family: †Cryptoclididae; Williston, 1925

Genera
- †Opallionectes?; Colymbosaurinae; †Abyssosaurus; †Colymbosaurus; †Djupedalia; †Ophthalmothule; †Pantosaurus; †Spitrasaurus; Muraenosaurinae; †Muraenosaurus; †Picrocleidus; †Tricleidus?; †Vinialesaurus?; Cryptoclidinae; †Cryptoclidus; †Kimmerosaurus; †Tatenectes; †Tricleidus?

= Cryptoclididae =

Cryptoclidids Temporal range: Middle Jurassic - Early Cretaceous, 170–130 Ma

Extinct family of reptiles

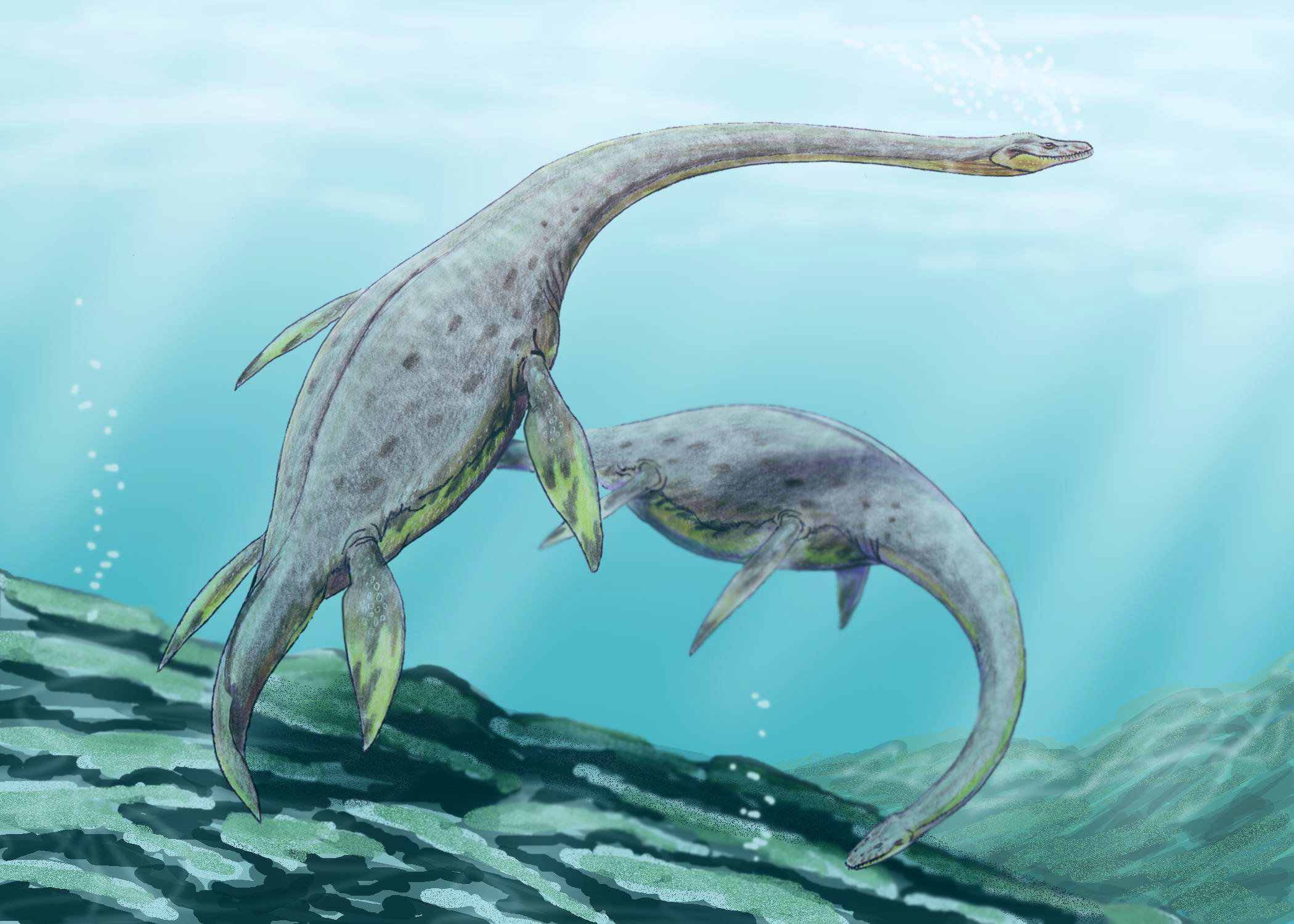
Life restoration of Muraenosaurus

Cryptoclididae is a family of medium-sized plesiosaurs that existed from the Middle Jurassic to the Early Cretaceous. They had long necks, broad and short skulls and densely packed teeth. They fed on small soft-bodied preys such as small fish and crustaceans. The earliest members of the family appeared during the early Bajocian, and they represented the dominant group of long-necked plesiosaurs during the latter half of the Jurassic.

== Classification ==
In 2010, two supposed late Cretaceous members of the group were reclassified as other kinds of plesiosauroids. Kaiwhekea was reclassified to Leptocleididae, and Aristonectes was transferred to Elasmosauridae.

Cladogram based on Ketchum and Benson (2010):

- Cryptoclididae
  - - Muraenosaurus
    - Tricleidus
  - - Cryptoclidus
    - Kimmerosaurus
