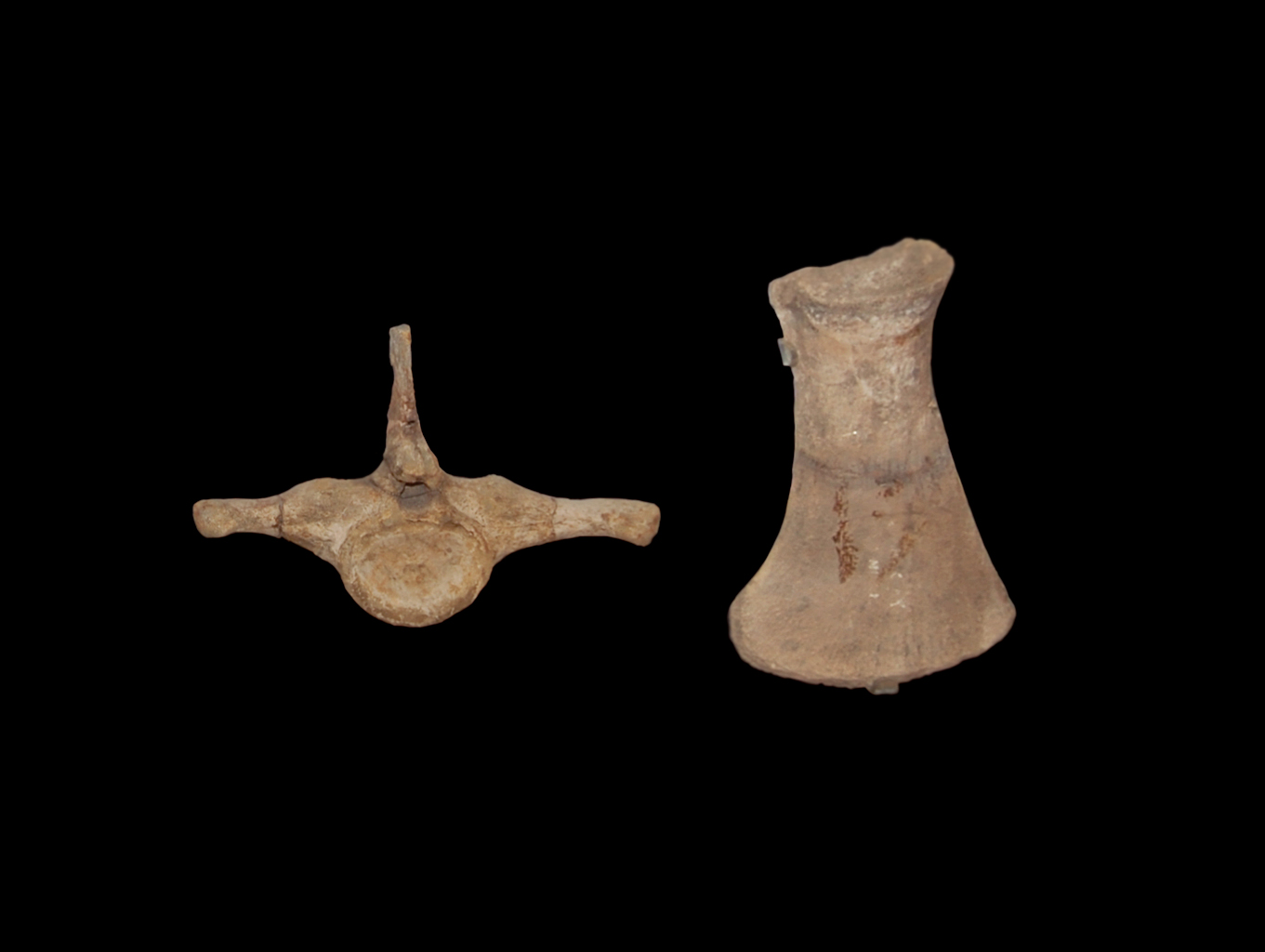
- Sacral vertebra (left) and humerus (right) of Colymbosaurus sp.

Scientific classification
- Kingdom: Animalia
- Phylum: Chordata
- Class: Reptilia
- Superorder: †Sauropterygia
- Order: †Plesiosauria
- Superfamily: †Plesiosauroidea
- Family: †Cryptoclididae
- Subfamily: †Cryptoclidinae
- Genus: †Colymbosaurus; Seeley, 1874

Type species
- †Colymbosaurus megadeirus Seeley, 1874

Species
- †C. megadeirus (Seeley, 1869); †C. svalbardensis (Persson, 2012)

Synonyms
- Tricleidus svalbardensis Persson, 1962

= Colymbosaurus =

Colymbosaurus Temporal range: Callovian-Tithonian, ~165–145 Ma

Extinct genus of reptiles

Colymbosaurus is a genus of cryptoclidid plesiosaur from the Middle-Late Jurassic (Callovian-Tithonian) of the UK and Svalbard, Norway. There are two currently recognized species, C. megadeirus and C. svalbardensis.

== Taxonomy ==
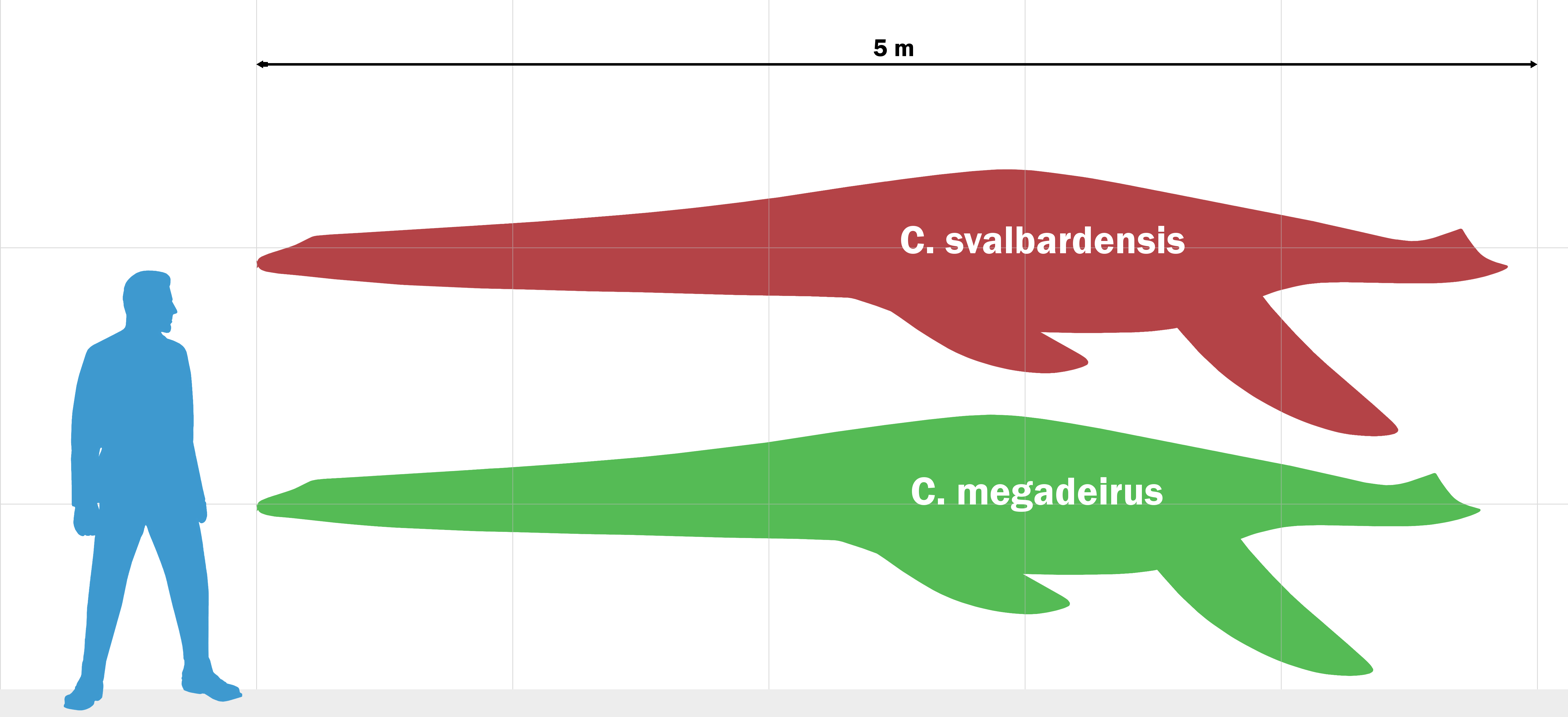
Scale diagram, presenting the two currently recognised species

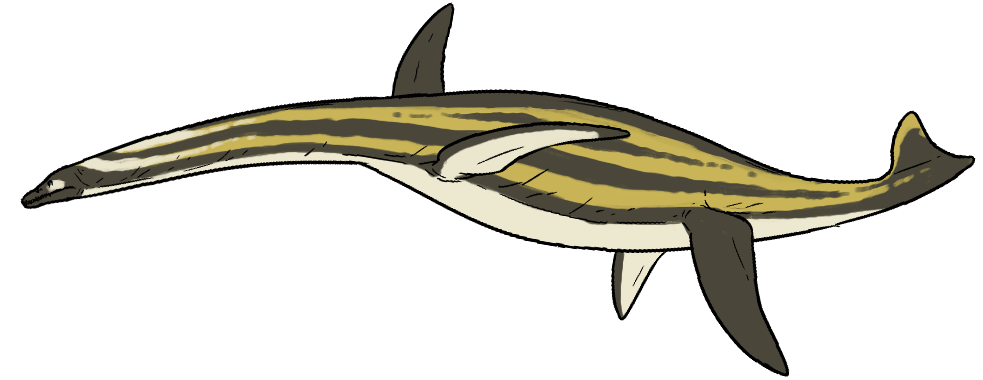
C. megadeirus life restoration

The first remains attributed to Colymbosaurus were described as a new species of Plesiosaurus, P. trochantericus. The holotype of the species, NHMUK PV OR 31787, a humerus (upper arm bone), comes from the Kimmeridgian Kimmeridge Clay Formation of Shotover, Oxfordshire, England. Richard Owen, however, misidentified the bone as a femur, an identification corrected in an 1871 publication on the geology of Oxfordshire.

In the meantime, other plesiosauroid remains were being described from the Kimmeridge Clay by independent workers. The species Plesiosaurus megadeirus was coined for two partial postcranial specimens in a publication cataloging Mesozoic tetrapod specimens in the collections of the Sedgwick Museum of Earth Sciences at the University of Cambridge. The name Pliosaurus portlandicus was coined for a partial hindlimb from Dorset, while John Whitaker Hulke erected the species Plesiosaurus manselii for an incomplete postcranial skeleton (NHMUK PV OR 40106) from Kimmeridge, Dorset. Harry Govier Seeley came to recognize Plesiosaurus megadeirus as generically distinct, and coined the name Colymbosaurus for the species. He later referred Pliosaurus portlandicus and Plesiosaurus manselii to Colymbosaurus and considered them distinct from C. megadeirus based on the morphology of the epipodials.

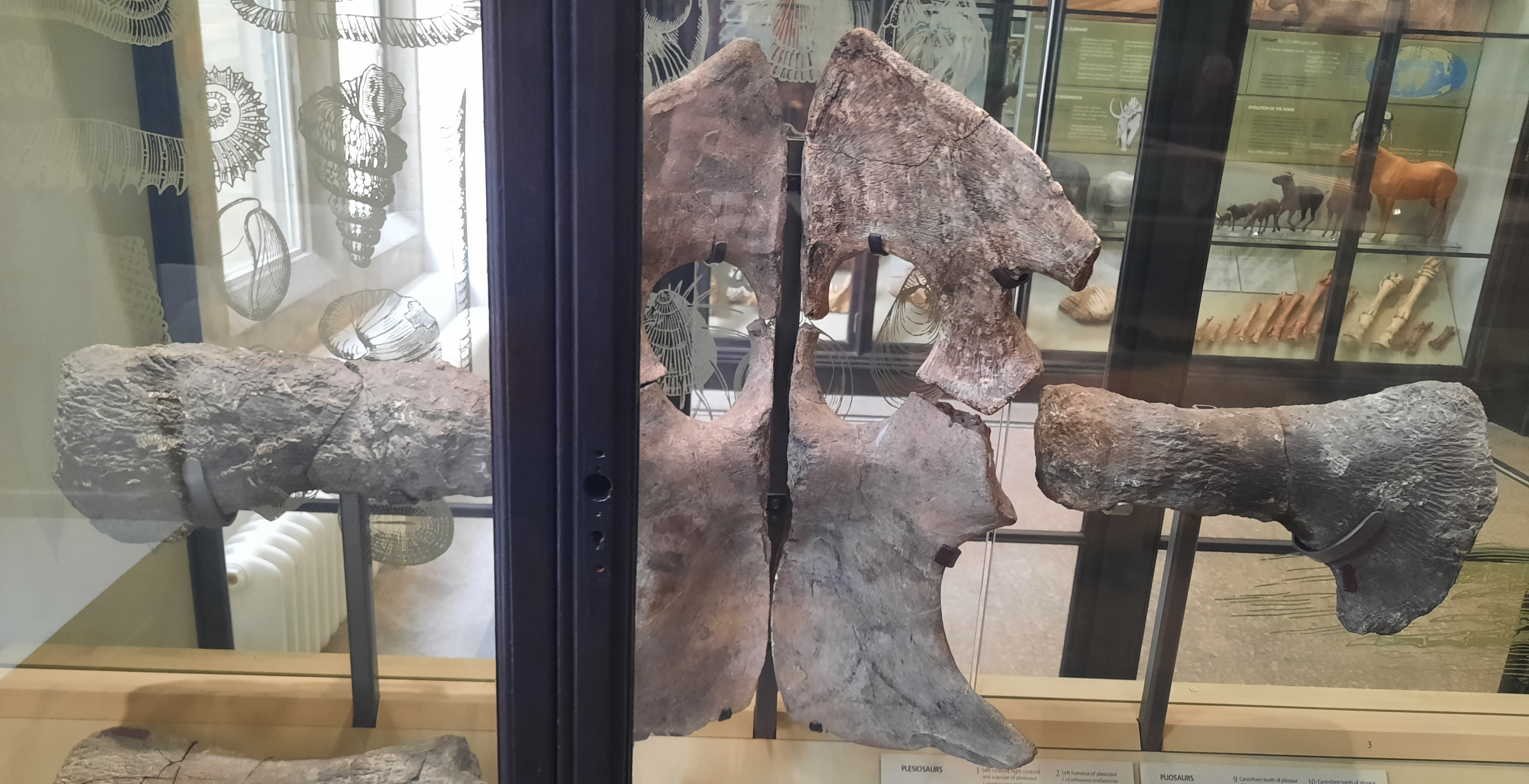
Colymbosaurus scapula and coracoids that were previously assigned to C. trochantericus

A review of all nominal species of plesiosauroids from the Late Jurassic of England resulted in the recognition of one species of Colymbosaurus, C. trochantericus. P. megadeirus, P. portlandicus, and P. manselii were synonymized with C. trochantericus. Because no skull remains were known, Colymbosaurus was considered possibly a senior synonym of Kimmerosaurus based on comparisons with referred material of Kimmerosaurus.

The distribution of Colymbosaurus was extended beyond the UK when the Norwegian "Tricleidus" svalbardensis was recognized as a valid species of Colymbosaurus, C. svalbardensis, based on the holotype, discovered in the winter of 1930-31 in the Agardhfjellet Formation, and more remains from the same formation described in 2012. This assignment, along with the discovery of new plesiosauroids from Svalbard, prompted a new revision of Kimmeridge Clay cryptoclidids. Plesiosaurus trochantericus was declared a nomen dubium, being referable to Colymbosaurus but indeterminate at the species level, while Kimmerosaurus and Plesiosaurus manselii were recognized as distinct. Because of this revision, megadeirus was resurrected as the epithet of the type species of Colymbosaurus.

== See also ==
- List of plesiosaur genera
- Timeline of plesiosaur research
