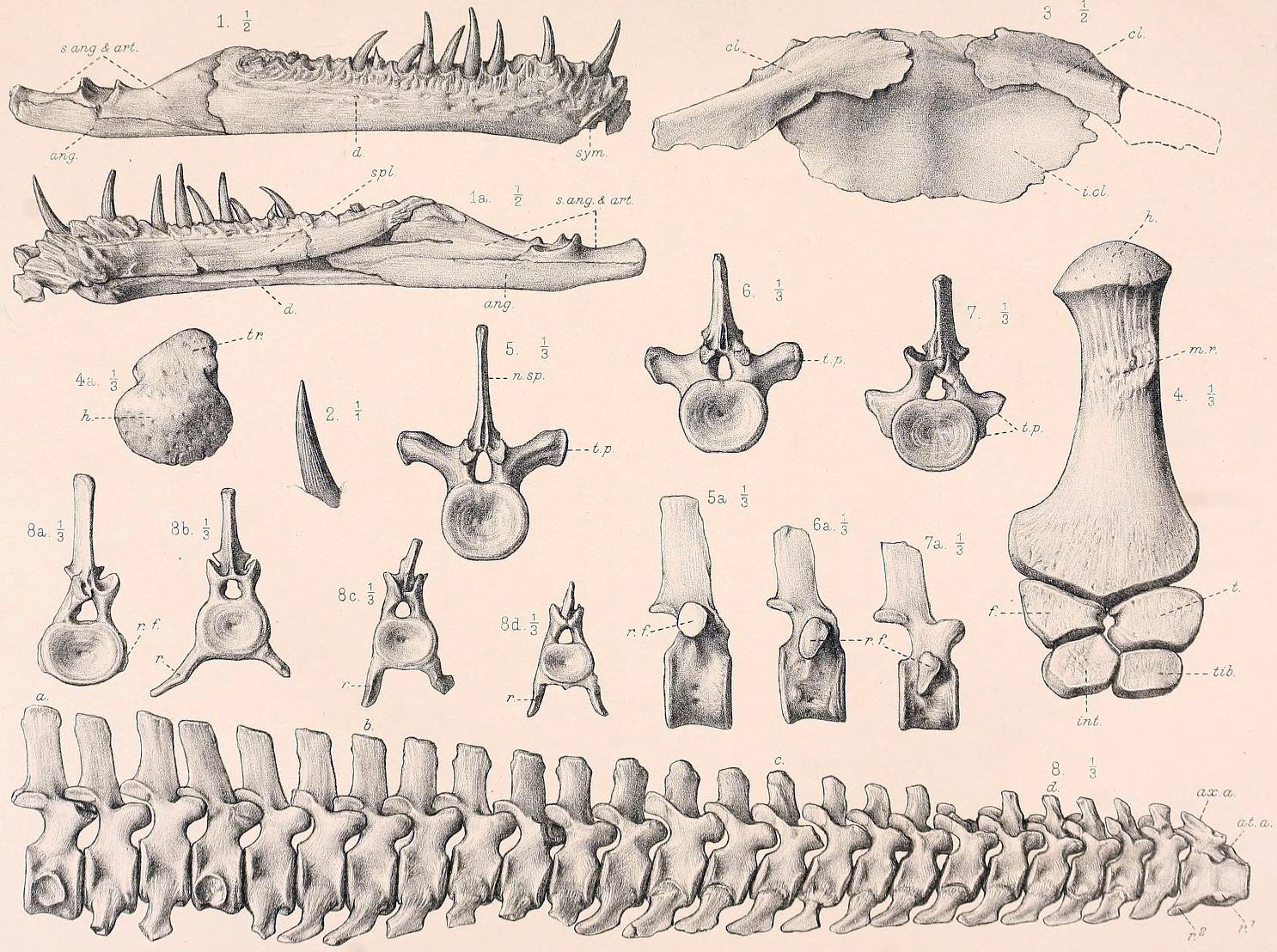
- Holotype specimen

Scientific classification
- Kingdom: Animalia
- Phylum: Chordata
- Class: Reptilia
- Superorder: †Sauropterygia
- Order: †Plesiosauria
- Superfamily: †Plesiosauroidea
- Family: †Cryptoclididae
- Subfamily: †Cryptoclidinae
- Genus: †Tricleidus; Andrews, 1909

Species
- T. seeleyi Andrews, 1909 (type)

= Tricleidus =

Tricleidus Temporal range: Middle Jurassic, Callovian

Extinct genus of reptiles

Tricleidus is an extinct genus of cryptoclidid plesiosaur known from only specimen (BMNH R3539) from the middle Jurassic of United Kingdom. It was first named by Andrews in 1909 and the type species is Tricleidus seeleyi.

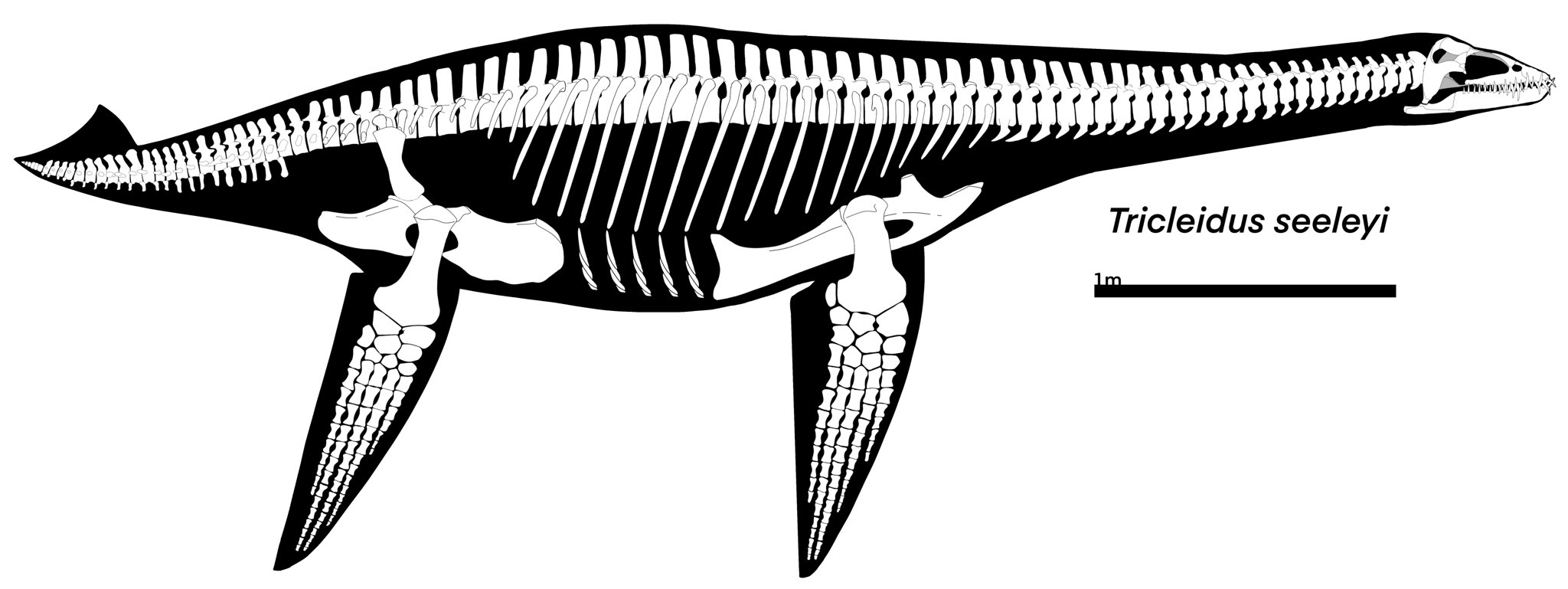
Skeletal diagram

One species, T. svalbardensis, was moved into Colymbosaurus in 2012. It was found in the Agardhfjellet Formation, Norway.

== See also ==
- List of plesiosaur genera
- Timeline of plesiosaur research
