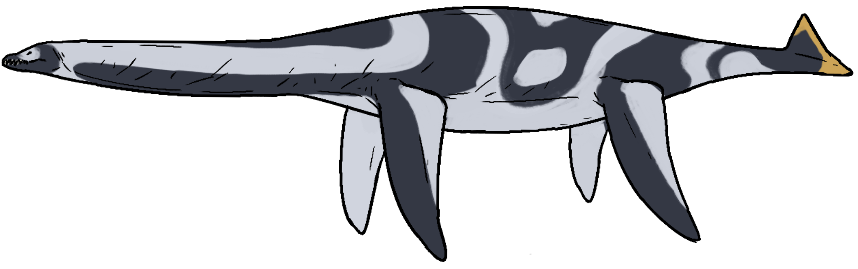
- Restoration

Scientific classification
- Domain: Eukaryota
- Kingdom: Animalia
- Phylum: Chordata
- Class: Reptilia
- Superorder: †Sauropterygia
- Order: †Plesiosauria
- Family: †Cryptoclididae
- Genus: †Pantosaurus; Marsh, 1893

Species
- †Pantosaurus striatus (Marsh, 1891 [originally Parasaurus striatus]) (type)

Synonyms
- Muraenosaurus reedii Mehl, 1912

= Pantosaurus =

Pantosaurus Temporal range: Late Jurassic, Oxfordian

Extinct genus of reptiles

Pantosaurus ("all lizard") is an extinct genus of plesiosaur from the Late Jurassic (Oxfordian) of what is now Wyoming. It lived in what used to be the Sundance Sea. It was originally named Parasaurus ("near lizard") by Othniel Charles Marsh in reference to Plesiosaurus, but that name was preoccupied, and Marsh changed it. The species Muraenosaurus reedii is in fact a junior synonym of Pantosaurus. The holotype YPM 543 is a partial articulated skeleton, partially prepared to yield a distal humerus, four articulated carpals, a fragment of the coracoid, and several isolated cervical vertebrae from the Upper Member of the Sundance Formation. Other material includes USNM 536963, USNM 536965, UW 3, UW 5544 and UW 15938.

== Description ==
Pantosaurus possesses between 35 and 40 cervical vertebrae, which are very similar in proportion and morphology to those of Muraenosaurus leedsii from the Oxford Clay Formation (Callovian, Middle Jurassic) of England. The forelimb of Pantosaurus however can be differentiated from that of Muraenosaurus, such as the relatively large size of the radius and the corresponding humerus-radius articulation. No Pantosaurus cranial material has yet been discovered.

== Palaeobiology ==
The discovery of a partially digested embryonic ichthyosaur (probably Baptanodon) inside of a fossil referable to Pantosaurus striatus was the first evidence of the consumption of ichthyosaurs by plesiosaurs.

== See also ==
- List of plesiosaur genera
- Timeline of plesiosaur research
