= List of ichthyosauromorph type specimens =

This list of ichthyosauromorph type specimens is a list of fossils serving as the official standard-bearers for inclusion in the species and genera of the reptile clade Ichthyosauromorpha (Hupehsuchia included). Type specimens are those which are definitionally members of biological taxa and additional specimens can only be "referred" to these taxa if an expert deems them sufficiently similar to the type.

== The list ==
Species	Genus	Catalogue number	Institution	Age	Unit	Country	Notes	Image
Acamptonectes densus	Acamptonectes	GLAHM 132588 (holotype) SNHM1284-R (paratype) NHMUK R11185 (paratype)	The Hunterian Museum, University of Glasgow, Glasgow; Staatliches Naturhistorisches Museum Braunschweig; Natural History Museum London	Hauteravian				Skull roof bones of the Acamptonectes densus holotype: GLAHM 132588
Actiosaurus gaudryi	Actiosaurus							
Aegirosaurus leptospondylus	Aegirosaurus							
Arthropterygius chrisorum	Arthropterygius	CMN 40608	Canadian Museum of Nature (Ottawa, Canada)	Oxfordian - Kimmeridgian		Canada		
Athabascasaurus bitumineus	Athabascasaurus	TMP 2000.29.01						
Barracudasauroides panxianensis	Barracudasauroides	GMPKU-P-1033	Geological Museum Peking University (Beijing, China)					
Barracudasaurus maotaiensis	Barracudasaurus	IVPP V 2468	Institute of Vertebrate Paleontology and Paleoanthropology (Beijing, China)	Ladinian?			exact age unclear, Middle Triassic	
Besanosaurus leptorhyncus	Besanosaurus	BES SC 999	Museo Civico di Storia Naturale Milano (Milan, Italy)	Anisian-Ladinian	Grenzbitumenzone Besano FM	Italy		
Brachypterygius extremus	Brachypterygius							
Californosaurus perrini	Californosaurus							
Callawayia neoscapularis	Callawayia							
Cartorhynchus lenticarpus	Cartorhynchus	AGM CH-628-16	Anhui Geological Museum (Hefei, China)	Olenekian (Spathian)		China		
Caypullisaurus bonapartei	Caypullisaurus							
Chacaicosaurus cayi	Chacaicosaurus	MOZ 5803						
Chaohusaurus brevifemoralis	Chaohusaurus	AGM AGB7401 (holotype) GMPKU P-3086 (paratype) AGB 7403 (paratype)	Anhui Geological Museum (Hefei, China); Geological Museum Peking University (Beijing, China)	Olenekian (Spathian)		China	previously placed under C. chaoxianensis	
Chaohusaurus chaoxianensis	Choahusaurus	AGM AGB2905	Anhui Geological Museum (Hefei, China)	Olenekian (Spathian)		China	previously referred to genus Anhuisaurus and Chensaurus	
Chaohusaurus geishanensis	Chaohusaurus	IVPP V 4001	Institute of Vertebrate Paleontology and Paleoanthropology (Beijing, China)	Olenekian (Spathian)		China		
Eohupehsuchus brevicollis	Eohupehsuchus	WGSC 26003	Wuhan Centre of Geological Survey China (Wuhan, China)	Olenekian (Spathian)		China		
Eretmorhipis carrolldongi	Eretmorhipis	WGSC 26020	Wuhan Centre of Geological Survey China (Wuhan, China)	Olenekian (Spathian)		China	see referred specimens YAGM V 1401 and WGSC V 1601 for skull morphology	
Guanlingsaurus liangae	Guanlingsaurus	GMR 014	Geological Survey of Guizhou, Guiyang PRC (collection currently curated by the government of Guanling County	Carnian				
Guizhouichthyosaurus tangae	Guizhouichthyosaurus	GMR 009	Geological Survey of Guizhou, Guiyang PRC (collection currently curated by the government of Guanling County	Carnian?		China		
Hudsonelpidia brevirostris	Hudsonelpidia	ROM 44629						
Hupehsuchus nanchangensis	Hupehsuchus	IVPP V3232	Institute of Vertebrate Paleontology and Paleoanthropology (Beijing, China)	Olenekian (Spathian)		China		
Mikadocephalus gracilirostris	Mikadocephalus	GPIT 1793/1	Geologisches und Palaeontologisches Institut Tübingen (Tübingen, Germany)	Anisian-Ladinian	Grenzbitumenzone Besano FM	Italy		
Muiscasaurus catheti	Muiscasaurus	CIP-FCG-CBP-74		Barremian-Aptian	Paja Formation	Colombia	Named after the Muisca	
Nanchangosaurus suni	Nanchangosaurus	GMC V636	Geological Museum of China, Beijing	Olenekian (Spathian)		China		
Parahupehsuchus longus	Parahupehsuchus	WGSC 26005	Wuhan Centre of Geological Survey China (Wuhan, China)	Olenekian (Spathian)		China		
Phantomosaurus neubigi	Phantomosaurus	BSP 1992 I 39	Bayerische Staatssammlung fûr Palaeontologie (Munich, Germany)	Anisian		Germany		
Platypterygius longmani	Platypterygius	QM F2453	Queensland Museum (Brisbane, Australia)			Australia	first referred to as Ichthyosaurus australis	
Protoichthyosaurus applebyi	Protoichthyosaurus	UNM.G.2017.1	University of Nottingham Museum (Nottingham, UK)	Sinemurian?				
Protoichthyosaurus prostaxalis	Protoichthyosaurus	BRLSI M3553 (holotype) BRLSI M3555 (paratype) LEICT G454.1951/164 (paratype)	Bath Royal Literary and Scientific Institution (Bath, UK) Leicester Arts and Museums Service, New Walk Museum and Art Gallery (Leicester, UK)	Sinemurian		United Kingdom		
Sclerocormus parviceps	Sclerocormus	AGB 6265	Anhui Geological Museum (Hefei, China)	Olenekian (Spathian)		China		
Stenopterygius aaleniensis	Stenopterygius	SMNS 90699	Staatliches Museum für Naturkunde Stuttgart (Stuttgart, Germany)	Aalenian		Germany		
Stenopterygius quadriscissus	Stenopterygius	GPIT 43/0219-1 (lectotype)	Geologisches und Palaeontologisches Institut Tübingen (Tübingen, Germany)	Toarcian		Germany		
Stenopterygius triscissus	Stenopterygius	GPIT 12/0224-2	Geologisches und Palaeontologisches Institut Tübingen (Tübingen, Germany)	Toarcian		Germany		
Stenopterygius uniter	Stenopterygius	GPIT 1491/10 (neotype)	Geologisches und Palaeontologisches Institut Tübingen (Tübingen, Germany)	Toarcian		Germany		
Suevoleviathan disinteger	Suevoleviathan	SMNS 15390	Staatliches Museum für Naturkunde Stuttgart (Stuttgart, Germany)	Toarcian		Germany	likely junior synonym of S. integer	
Suevoleviathan integer	Suevoleviathan	MCZ 1042	Harvard University Museum of Comparative Zoology (Cambridge, USA)	Toarcian		Germany		
Temnodontosaurus azerguensis	Temnodontosaurus	MAMSPLP unnumbered	Musee des Amis de la Mine (Saint-Pierre La Palud, France)	Toarcian		France		
Temnodontosaurus eurycephalus	Temnodontosaurus	NHMUK R1157	Natural History Museum London UK	Sinemurian		United Kingdom		
Temnodontosaurus nuertingensis	Temnodontosaurus	SMNS 13488	Staatliches Museum für Naturkunde Stuttgart (Stuttgart, Germany)	Toarcian		Germany		
Temnodontosaurus platyodon	Temnodontosaurus			Hettangian - Sinemurian				
Temnodontosaurus trigonodon	Temnodontosaurus	PB 1	Petrefaktensammlung Kloster Banz (Bad Staffelstein, Germany)	Toarcian		Germany	head is 2,10 m long--biggest in Europe	
Utatsusaurus hataii	Utatsusaurus	IGPS 95941	Institute of Geology and Paleontology, Tohoku University, Sendai, Japan	Olenekian (Spathian)		Japan		
Wahlisaurus massarae	Wahlisaurus	LEICT G454.1951.5	Leicester Arts and Museums Service, New Walk Museum and Art Gallery (Leicester, UK)	Hettangian				

== See also ==
- List of ichthyosaurs
- Timeline of ichthyosaur research
