= List of ichthyosauromorph genera =

This list of ichthyosauromorphs is a comprehensive listing of all genera that have ever been included in the clade Ichthyosauromorpha, excluding purely vernacular terms. The list includes all commonly accepted genera, but also genera that are now considered invalid, doubtful (nomen dubium), or were not formally published (nomen nudum), as well as junior synonyms of more established names, and genera that are no longer considered ichthyopterygian. Non-ichthyosaur ichthyopterygians shall be noted as such. This list contains 124 genera.

== Scope and terminology ==
There is no official, canonical list of ichthyosauromorph genera but one of the most thorough attempts can be found at the "Ichthyosauromorpha" section of Mikko Haaramo's Phylogeny Archive.

Naming conventions and terminology follow the International Code of Zoological Nomenclature. Technical terms used include:

- Junior synonym: A name which describes the same taxon as a previously published name. If two or more genera are formally designated and the type specimens are later assigned to the same genus, the first to be published (in chronological order) is the senior synonym, and all other instances are junior synonyms. Senior synonyms are generally used, except by special decision of the ICZN, but junior synonyms cannot be used again, even if deprecated. Junior synonymy is often subjective, unless the genera described were both based on the same type specimen.
- Nomen nudum (Latin for "naked name"): A name that has appeared in print but has not yet been formally published by the standards of the ICZN. Nomina nuda (the plural form) are invalid, and are therefore not italicized as a proper generic name would be. If the name is later formally published, that name is no longer a nomen nudum and will be italicized on this list. Often, the formally published name will differ from any nomina nuda that describe the same specimen. In this case, these nomina nuda will be deleted from this list in favor of the published name.
- Preoccupied name: A name that is formally published, but which has already been used for another taxon. This second use is invalid (as are all subsequent uses) and the name must be replaced. As preoccupied names are not valid generic names, they will also go unitalicized on this list.
- Nomen dubium (Latin for "dubious name"): A name describing a fossil with no unique diagnostic features. As this can be an extremely subjective and controversial designation, this term is not used on this list.

== The list ==
Genus	Authors	Year	Status	Age	Location	Notes	Images
Acamptonectes	Fischer et al.	2012	Valid	Early Cretaceous	Germany; United Kingdom (England)	Possessed an unusually rigid trunk, which would make the extent of its lateral locomotion very limited	
Actiosaurus	Sauvage	1883	Dubious	Late Triassic	France	While originally described as a dinosaur and later reinterpreted as an ichthyosaur, it may actually represent a choristodere	
Acuetzpalin	Barrientos-Lara & Alvarado-Ortega	2020	Valid	Late Jurassic	Mexico	Known from a partial limbless skeleton with a well-preserved skull	
Aegirosaurus	Bardet & Fernández	2000	Valid	Late Jurassic to Early Cretaceous	France; Germany	Four of its caudal vertebrae made its tail to bend roughly 45° downwards	
Ammonitritor	Sander et al.	2026	Valid	Early Triassic	Norway	Known from a well-preserved skull	
Anhuisaurus	Chen	1985	Jr. synonym	N/A	N/A	Preoccupied by lizard genus Anhuisaurus (Hou, 1974). Junior synonym of Chaohusaurus	
Argovisaurus	Miedema et al.	2024	Valid	Middle Jurassic	Switzerland	May have preserved traumatic injuries based on abnormalities in its skeleton	
Arthropterygius	Maxwell	2010	Valid	Late Jurassic to Early Cretaceous?	Argentina; Canada; Norway; Russia	Its rostrum was relatively short and robust	
Athabascasaurus	Druckenmiller & Maxwell	2010	Valid	Early Cretaceous	Canada	The holotype was discovered at an oilsand mine	
Auroroborealia	Zverkov et al.	2021	Valid	Late Triassic	Russia	Suggested to be a small-bodied animal although its exact ontogenetic stage is uncertain due to fragmentary remains	
Baisesaurus	Ren et al.	2022	Valid	Early Triassic	China	Very similar to Utatsusaurus	
Baptanodon	Marsh	1880	Valid	Late Jurassic	United States	Formerly erroneously thought to have been toothless	
Barracudasauroides	Maisch	2010	Valid	Middle Triassic	China	Only known from a partial skeleton originally referred to Mixosaurus	
Barracudasaurus	Jiang et al.	2005	Dubious	Middle Triassic	China	Its premaxillary teeth were rounded in cross-section	
Besanosaurus	Dal Sasso & Pinna	1996	Valid	Middle Triassic	Italy; Switzerland	May have had strong jaw muscles as indicated by its skull bones	
Brachypterygius	von Huene	1922	Valid	Late Jurassic	United Kingdom (England)	Closely related to Platypterygius and Caypullisaurus	
Californosaurus	Kuhn	1934	Valid	Middle Triassic to Late Triassic	Germany; United States	Originally named as a species of Shastasaurus	
Callawayia	Maische & Matzke	2000	Valid	Late Triassic	Canada	The morphology of its scapulae was more similar to those of Jurassic ichthyosaurs than to other Triassic taxa	
Cartorhynchus	Motani et al.	2014	Valid	Early Triassic	China	Represents a sudden diversification of marine reptiles that occurred shortly after the Permian-Triassic extinction event	
Catutosaurus	Fernández et al.	2021	Valid	Late Jurassic	Argentina	Represented by at least three fragmentary specimens	
Caypullisaurus	Fernández	1997	Valid	Late Jurassic to Early Cretaceous	Argentina	Each of its forelimbs contained ten digits	
Chacaicosaurus	Fernández	1994	Valid	Middle Jurassic	Argentina	Inconsistent in phylogenetic placement	
Chaohusaurus	Young & Dong	1972	Valid	Early Triassic	China	One specimen preserves the remains of two embryos and a neonate	
Chensaurus	Mazin et al.	1991	Jr. synonym	N/A	N/A	Junior synonym of Chaohusaurus	
Chonespondylus	Leidy	1868	Jr. synonym	N/A	N/A	Junior synonym of Cymbospondylus	
Contectopalatus	Maische & Matzke	1998	Jr. synonym?	N/A	N/A	Possibly a junior synonym of Phalarodon	
Cryopterygius	Druckenmiller et al.	2012	Jr. synonym	N/A	N/A	Junior synonym of Undorosaurus	
Cymbospondylus	Leidy	1868	Valid	Early Triassic to Middle Triassic	Switzerland; United States	Lacked a dorsal fin and fluked tail, which would suggest it probably swam by wriggling its body from side to side like a modern sea snake	
Dearcmhara	Brusatte et al.	2015	Valid	Early Jurassic to Middle Jurassic	United Kingdom (Scotland)	The first ichthyosaur discovered in Scotland	
Delphinosaurus	Eichwald	1853	Dubious	Early Cretaceous to Late Cretaceous	Russia	Originally mistakenly believed to be an amphibian	
Eretmorhipis	Chen et al.	2015	Valid	Early Triassic	China	Exhibited a suite of unusual features, such as relatively small eyes, a platypus-like snout, and plates on its back similar to those of stegosaurs	
Eternauta	Campos et al.	2025	Valid	Late Jurassic	Argentina	May have relied on deep-diving while hunting its prey as suggested by its preserved scleral ring	
Eurhinosaurus	Abel	1909	Valid	Early Jurassic	Belgium; France; Germany; Luxembourg; Netherlands; Switzerland; United Kingdom (England)	Its upper jaw was twice as long as the lower jaw, convergent with billfish	
Eurypterygius	Jaekel	1904	Jr. synonym	N/A	N/A	Junior synonym of Ichthyosaurus	
Excalibosaurus	McGowan	1986	Valid	Early Jurassic	United Kingdom (England)	May have been a rare component of its environment as only two skeletons are known	
Fernatator	Massare et al.	2025	Valid	Early Jurassic	Canada	The most complete ichthyosaur known from the Early Jurassic of North America	
Gadusaurus	Pratas e Souza et al.	2025	Valid	Early Jurassic	Portugal	Although the majority of the cranial sutures are completely fused, which is often seen in adult ichthyosaurs, the midline suture is not fused, which would indicate the holotype belonged to either a juvenile or subadult individual	
Gengasaurus	Paparella et al.	2017	Valid	Late Jurassic	Italy	Before its formal description, it had been nicknamed the "Genga ichthyosaur"	
Grendelius	McGowan	1976	Valid	Late Jurassic	Russia; United Kingdom (England)	Once considered to be synonymous with Brachypterygius	
Grippia	Wiman	1930	Valid	Early Triassic	Canada; China; Greenland; Japan; Norway	Members of this genus may have swum by moving their tails laterally, similar to an eel	
Guanlingsaurus	Yin et al.	2000	Valid	Late Triassic	China	Has been suggested to be an Asian species of Shastasaurus	
Guizhouichthyosaurus	Cao & Luo	2000	Valid	Middle Triassic to Late Triassic	China	Two morphotypes of skulls and limbs are known, which could be an indication of sexual dimorphism	
Gulosaurus	Cuthbertson et al.	2013	Valid	Early Triassic	Canada	Originally thought to belong to either Grippia or Parvinatator	
Hauffiopteryx	Maisch	2008	Valid	Early Jurassic	Germany; Luxembourg; Switzerland; United Kingdom (England)	Distinguished by its short, very thin snout	
Himalayasaurus	Dong	1972	Valid	Late Triassic	China	Similarly to Thalattoarchon, its teeth possessed distinctive cutting edges	
Hudsonelpidia	McGowan	1995	Valid	Late Triassic	Canada	The holotype specimen is almost complete	
Hupehsuchus	Young	1972	Valid	Early Triassic	China	Has been suggested to be a filter feeder, similar to baleen whales, although a 2025 review argues that it most likely fed like a pelican	
Ichthyosaurus	De la Beche & Conybeare	1821	Valid	Early Jurassic	Belgium; Germany; Portugal; United Kingdom (England)	The first ichthyosaur genus to be validly named and described	
Ichthyotitan	Lomax et al.	2024	Valid	Late Triassic	United Kingdom (England)	The largest ichthyosaur and marine reptile currently known	
Isfjordosaurus	Motani	1999	Valid	Early Triassic	Norway	Named as a species of Pessopteryx before being assigned to its own genus	
Jabalisaurus	Barrientos-Lara & Alvarado-Ortega	2021	Valid	Late Jurassic	Germany; Mexico	Known from two species, J. meztli and J. tethyensis, which were originally believed to be specimens of Ophthalmosaurus and Aegirosaurus, respectively	
Janusaurus	Roberts et al.	2014	Valid	Late Jurassic	Norway	Has been suggested to be synonymous with Arthropterygius although this was disputed by a subsequent study	
Kazakhstanosaurus	Bolatovna & Makustovich	2021	Valid	Late Jurassic	Kazakhstan; Russia	Two species are known	
Keilhauia	Delsett et al.	2017	Valid	Early Cretaceous	Norway	Can be distinguished from other ophthalmosaurids by the wide top end of the ilium and exceptionally short ischiopubis compared to the femur	
Kyhytysuka	Cortés et al.	2021	Valid	Early Cretaceous	Colombia	Formerly thought to represent a species of Platypterygius, but it was assigned to its own genus due to morphological differences	
Leninia	Fischer et al.	2013	Valid	Early Cretaceous	Russia	One of the latest-surviving ophthalmosaurines	
Lentamanusuchus	Qiao, Iijima & Liu	2025	Valid	Early Triassic	China	Possessed unusually wide autopodia compared to other hupehsuchians	
Leptocheirus	Merriam	1903	Jr. synonym	N/A	N/A	Junior synonym of Toretocnemus	
Leptonectes	McGowan	1996	Valid	Late Triassic to Early Jurassic	Belgium; Germany; Spain; United Kingdom (England)	One referred specimen reported from Switzerland has been found to actually belong to the related Hauffiopteryx	
Leptopterygius	Huene	1929	Jr. synonym	N/A	N/A	Junior synonym of Leptonectes	
Macgowania	Motani	1999	Valid	Late Triassic	Canada	Originally misidentified as a species of Ichthyosaurus	
Macropterygius	von Huene	1922	Dubious	Late Jurassic	United Kingdom (England)	Several specimens have been assigned to this genus, but only the type, a single vertebra, can confidently be referred to it	
Magnipterygius	Maisch & Matzke	2022	Valid	Early Jurassic	Germany	Shares some features with Stenopterygius	
Maiaspondylus	Maxwell & Caldwell	2006	Valid	Early Cretaceous to Late Cretaceous	Canada; Russia; United Kingdom (England)	One particular specimen proves this genus, just like other ichthyosaurs, was viviparous	
Malawania	Fischer et al.	2013	Valid	Early Cretaceous	Iraq	Relatively basal compared to other Cretaceous ichthyosaur taxa	
Merriamia	Boulenger	1904	Jr. synonym	N/A	N/A	Junior synonym of Toretocnemus	
Metashastasaurus	Nicholls & Manabe	2001	Jr. synonym	N/A	N/A	Junior synonym of Callawayia	
Mikadocephalus	Maisch & Matzke	1997	Jr. synonym	N/A	N/A	Junior synonym of Besanosaurus	
Mixosaurus	Baur	1887	Valid	Middle Triassic	China; Italy; Switzerland	Various species have been named, but most have been considered doubtful or assigned to new genera	
Mollesaurus	Fernández	1999	Valid	Middle Jurassic	Argentina	The oldest known ophthalmosaurid	
Muiscasaurus	Maxwell et al.	2015	Valid	Early Cretaceous	Colombia	May have been a specialized predator that fed on small, soft prey	
Myobradypterygius	von Huene	1927	Valid	Early Cretaceous	Argentina; Chile?	Once thought to be a species of Platypterygius	
Myopterygius	von Huene	1922	Jr. synonym	N/A	N/A	Junior synonym of Platypterygius	
Nanchangosaurus	Wang	1959	Valid	Middle Triassic	China	Its back carried bony scutes, not unlike an alligator	
Nannopterygius	von Huene	1922	Valid	Middle Jurassic to Early Cretaceous	Kazakhstan; Norway; Russia; United Kingdom (England)	Similar to Ophthalmosaurus but with smaller flippers. Six species are recognized	
Omphalosaurus	Merriam	1906	Valid	Early Triassic to Middle Triassic	Austria; Norway; Poland; United States	Its bones were relatively fast-growing as evidenced by the presence of woven-fibered bone tissue	
Ophthalmosaurus	Seeley	1874	Valid	Middle Jurassic to Late Jurassic	United Kingdom (England)	Noted for its proportionally large eyes, which could measure between 22–23 centimetres (8.7–9.1 in) in diameter	
Otschevia	Efimov	1998	Jr. synonym	N/A	N/A	Junior synonym of Grendelius	
Pachygonosaurus	von Huene	1916	Dubious	Middle Triassic	Poland	Only definitively known from two vertebrae	
Palvennia	Druckenmiller et al.	2012	Valid	Late Jurassic	Norway	One study considered it to be a junior synonym of Arthropterygius, but this was not supported by later research	
Panjiangsaurus	Chen & Chang	2003	Jr. synonym	N/A	N/A	Junior synonym of Guizhouichthyosaurus	
Parahupehsuchus	Chen et al.	2014	Valid	Early Triassic	China	Unlike other hupehsuchians, it possessed flat, wide ribs	
Paraophthalmosaurus	Arkhangelsky	1997	Jr. synonym	N/A	N/A	Junior synonym of Nannopterygius	
Parrassaurus	Barrientos-Lara & Alvarado-Ortega	2021	Valid	Late Jurassic	Mexico	Relatively large for an ophthalmosaurid	
Parvinatator	Nicholls & Brinkman	1995	Valid	Early Triassic to Middle Triassic	Canada	The only known specimen has a badly damaged skull	
Pessopteryx	Wiman	1910	Valid	Early Triassic	Norway	Originally known from four species, but only the type can confidently be assigned to the genus	
Pessosaurus	Wiman	1910	Valid	Middle Triassic	Norway	Two species have been described	
Phalarodon	Merriam	1910	Valid	Middle Triassic	Canada; China; Germany; Norway; Switzerland? United States	Mostly known from specimens consisting of cranial remains	
Phantomosaurus	Maisch & Matzke	2000	Valid	Middle Triassic	Germany	Although it was closely related to Cymbospondylus, its braincase resembled more that of other diapsids than other ichthyosaurs	
Platypterygius	von Huene	1922	Valid	Early Cretaceous to Late Cretaceous	Australia; Colombia; Germany; United States	Several species have been named, but most may not be diagnostic or belong to this genus	
Plutoniosaurus	Efimov	1997	Dubious?	Early Cretaceous	Russia	May be identical to Simbirskiasaurus	
Proteosaurus	Home	1819	Jr. synonym	N/A	N/A	Junior synonym of Ichthyosaurus	
Protoichthyosaurus	Appleby	1979	Valid	Early Jurassic	Switzerland? United Kingdom (England)	Has been considered a junior synonym of Ichthyosaurus, but a 2017 study found that it could be distinguished from that genus based on the morphology of its forelimbs	
Qianichthyosaurus	Li	1999	Valid	Late Triassic	China	A relatively common component of its habitat, known from remains of both juvenile and pregnant individuals	
Quasianosteosaurus	Maisch & Matzke	2003	Valid	Early Triassic	Norway	Had the largest skull of any Early Triassic ichthyosaur	
Rachitrema	Sauvage	1883	Dubious	Late Triassic	France	Initially believed to be a dinosaur	
Sangiorgiosaurus	Brinkmann	1998	Jr. synonym	N/A	N/A	Junior synonym of Mixosaurus	
Sclerocormus	Jiang et al.	2016	Valid	Early Triassic	China	Unusually proportioned with a heavily built trunk, long tail, and small head	
Shastasaurus	Merriam	1895	Valid	Late Triassic	Canada? China? United States	A referred species, which was one of the largest marine reptiles, estimated at 21 metres (69 ft) long, has been suggested by several analyses to belong to either this genus or Shonisaurus	
Shonisaurus	Camp	1976	Valid	Late Triassic	United States	One of the largest ichthyosaurs yet known. State fossil of Nevada	
Simbirskia	Otschev & Efimov	1985	Jr. synonym	N/A	N/A	Junior synonym of Platypterygius	
Simbirskiasaurus	Otschev & Efimov	1985	Valid	Early Cretaceous	Russia	Closely related to Platypterygius	
Sisteronia	Fischer et al.	2014	Valid	Early Cretaceous	France; United Kingdom (England)	Its discovery suggests a greater diversity of ichthyosaurs from Early Cretaceous Europe than previously thought	
Stenopterygius	Jaekel	1904	Valid	Early Jurassic to Middle Jurassic	France; Germany; Luxembourg; Switzerland; United Kingdom (England)	One well-known specimen proves that ichthyosaur infants were born tail-first, just like cetaceans, to prevent them from drowning before fully clearing the birth canal	
Suevoleviathan	Maisch	1998	Valid	Early Jurassic	Germany	Had uniquely large forefins compared to other ichthyosaurs	
Sumpalla	Campos et al.	2021	Valid	Late Jurassic	Argentina	Originally thought to be a specimen of Aegirosaurus	
Svalbardosaurus	Mazin	1981	Dubious	Early Triassic	Norway	Although initially described as an ichthyosaur, it was later suggested to be an amphibian	
Sveltonectes	Fischer et al.	2011	Valid	Early Cretaceous	Russia	Its teeth have an unusual morphology	
Temnodontosaurus	Lydekker	1889	Valid	Early Jurassic	Belgium; Chile? France; Germany; Italy; Luxembourg; Switzerland; United Kingdom (England)	Possibly had the largest eyes of any known animal, rivaling those of a colossal squid in size	
Thaisaurus	Mazin et al.	1991	Valid	Early Triassic	Thailand	The first and fifth metacarpals are identical in size	
Thalassodraco	Jacobs & Martill	2020	Valid	Late Jurassic	United Kingdom (England)	May be closely related to Nannopterygius	
Thalattoarchon	Fröbisch et al.	2013	Valid	Middle Triassic	United States	The apex predator of its ecosystem, filling an ecological role similar to orcas	
Tholodus	von Meyer	1851	Valid	Middle Triassic	China? Germany; Italy	Mainly known from teeth and fragments of jaws	
Toretocnemus	Merriam	1903	Valid	Late Triassic	Mexico; United States	Had very large eye sockets and narrow jugals	
Typicusichthyosaurus	Yin et al.	2000	Jr. synonym?	N/A	N/A	Probably a junior synonym of Guanlingsaurus, but this cannot be confirmed due to poor preservation	
Undorosaurus	Efimov	1999	Valid	Late Jurassic	Norway; Poland; Russia	Can be distinguished from Ophthalmosaurus by characters of its ischiopubis and teeth	
Utatsusaurus	Shikama et al.	1978	Valid	Early Triassic	Canada; Japan	The earliest known ichthyopterygian	
Wahlisaurus	Lomax	2016	Valid	Early Jurassic	United Kingdom (England)	Its shoulder girdle is markedly different from that of Eurhinosaurus	
Wimanius	Maisch & Matzke	1998	Valid	Middle Triassic	Switzerland	Has been recovered in a variety of phylogenetic positions within the Hueneosauria	
Xinminosaurus	Jiang et al.	2008	Valid	Middle Triassic	China	Has been suggested to be synonymous with Tholodus	
Xiphodracon	Lomax, Massare & Maxwell	2025	Valid	Early Jurassic	United Kingdom (England)	Probably closely related to Hauffiopteryx	
Yasykovia	Efimov	1999	Jr. synonym	N/A	N/A	Junior synonym of Nannopterygius	

== See also ==
- Ichthyosaur
- Ichthyopterygia
- List of dinosaurs
- List of mosasaurs
- List of plesiosaurs
- List of pterosaurs
- List of ichthyosaur type specimens
- Timeline of ichthyosaur research
