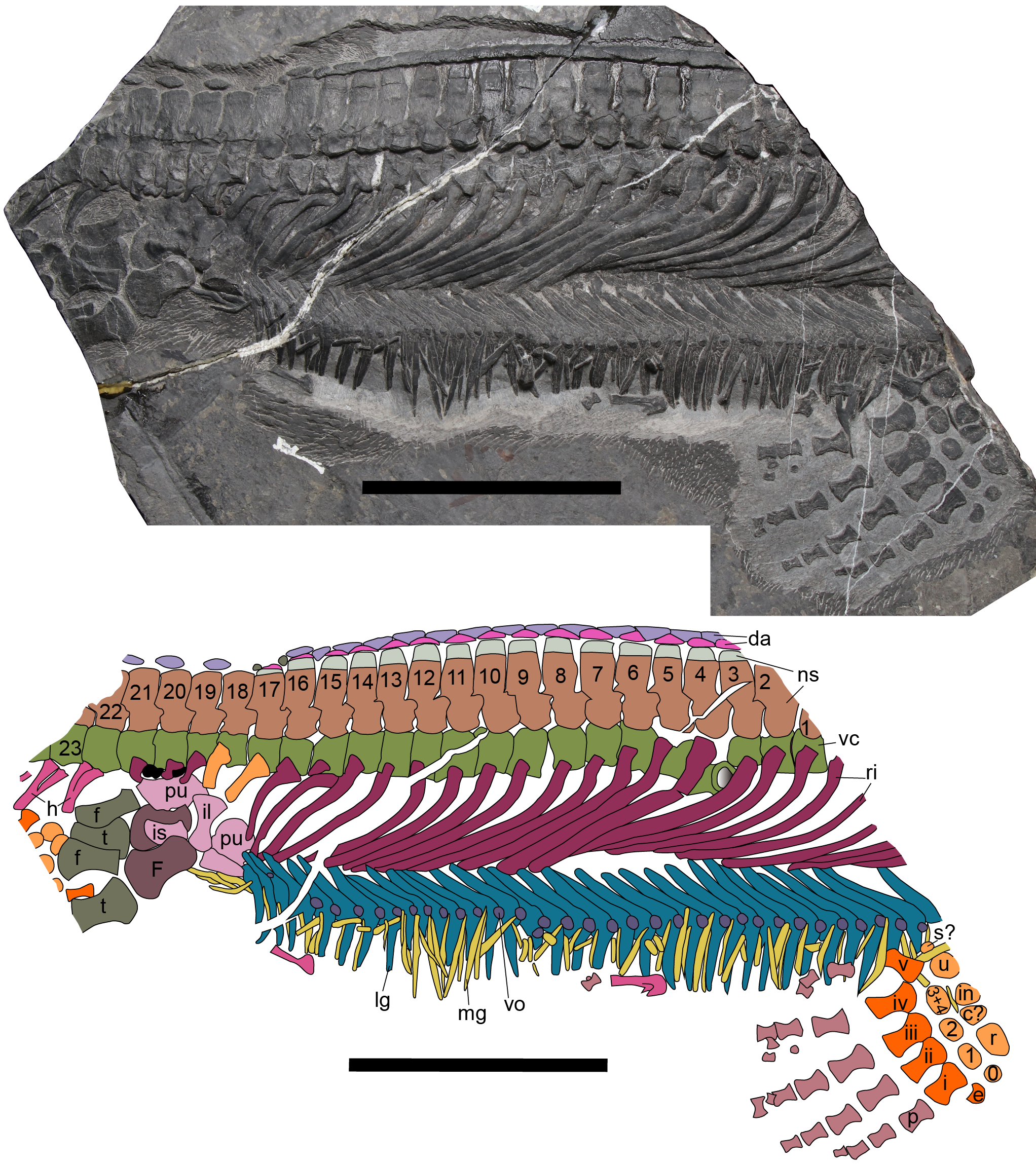
- Holotype specimen

Scientific classification
- Kingdom: Animalia
- Phylum: Chordata
- Class: Reptilia
- Clade: †Ichthyosauromorpha
- Order: †Hupehsuchia
- Family: †Hupehsuchidae
- Genus: †Lentamanusuchus; Qiao, Iijima & Liu, 2025
- Species: †L. hubeiensis

Binomial name
- †Lentamanusuchus hubeiensis Qiao, Iijima & Liu, 2025

= Lentamanusuchus =

Lentamanusuchus Temporal range: Early Triassic, Olenekian (Spathian)

Genus of ichthyosauromorphs

Lentamanusuchus (lit. 'pliant hand crocodile') is an extinct genus of hupehsuchian ichthyosauromorph reptiles known from the Early Triassic Jialingjiang Formation of China. The genus contains a single species, Lentamanusuchus hubeiensis, known from a partial articulated skeleton. It is characterized by its unusually widely spaced autopodia, which may have contributed to forming a larger, smooth flipper to aid in swimming.

== Discovery and naming ==
The Lentamanusuchus holotype specimen, HFUT YZSB-19-100, was discovered in the Yingzishan Quarry, representing outcrops of the Jialingjiang Formation in Yuan'an County of Hubei Province, China. The specimen is a partial, articulated skeleton, comprising several dorsal (back), sacral, and caudal (tail vertebrae), in addition to the associated ribs, gastralia, osteoderms, and part of the forelimb, pelvic girdle, and hindlimb.

In 2025, Qiao, Iijima & Liu described Lentamanusuchus hubeiensis as a new genus and species of hupehsuchian ichthyosauromorphs based on these fossil remains. The generic name, Lentamanusuchus, combines the Latin words lenta, meaning "pliant", manus, meaning "hand", and suchus, meaning "crocodile" (used in this context to allude to a crocodile-like reptile). The specific name, hubeiensis, references the discovery of the specimen in Hubei Province.

== Classification ==
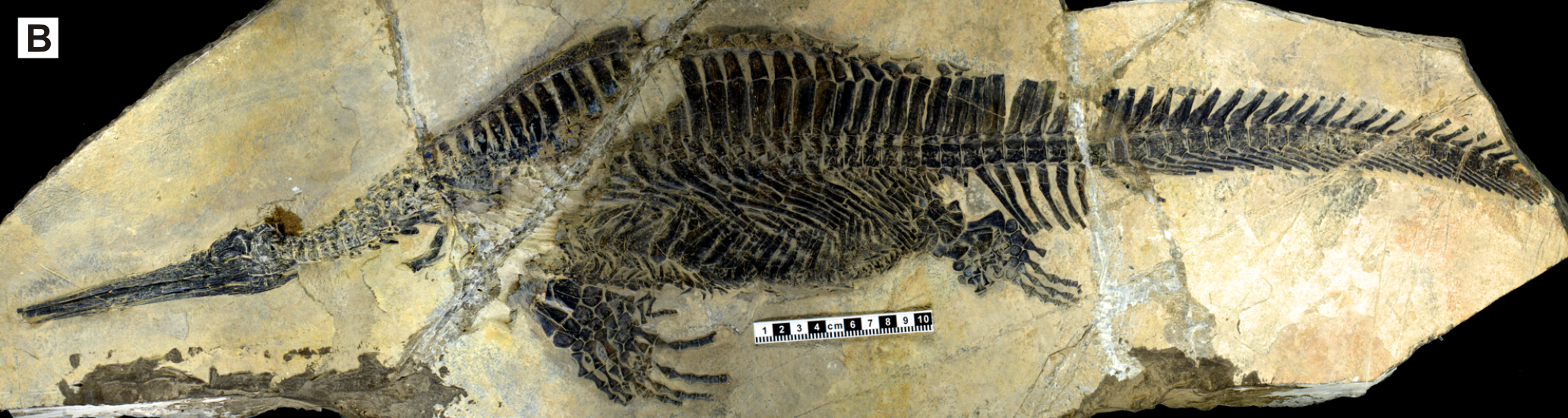
Skeleton of the related Hupehsuchus

In their 2025 phylogenetic analysis, Qiao and colleagues recovered Lentamanusuchus as a member of the ichthyosauromorph clade Hupehsuchia, in the more exclusive clade Hupehsuchidae, diverging after Hupehsuchus. It was found to be the sister taxon to the Parahupehsuchinae, which in turn comprises Parahupehsuchus, Eretmorhipis, and an unnamed taxon known only from forelimb material. These results are displayed in the cladogram below:

- Ichthyosauromorpha
  - Ichthyosauriformes
    - Cartorhynchus
    - Chaohusaurus
  - Hupehsuchia
    - Nanchangosaurus
    - - Eohupehsuchus
      - Hupehsuchidae
        - Hupehsuchus
        - - Lentamanusuchus
          - Parahupehsuchinae
            - Parahupehsuchus
            - - Eretmorhipis
              - HFUT YZSB-19-141 Parahupehsuchinae indet.
