= Jialingjiang Formation =

Geologic feature in China

- Stratigraphic range: Olenekian; ~249.9–246.7 Ma
- Type: Geological formation
- Underlies: Feixianguan Formation
- Overlies: Leikoupo Formation; Guanling Formation

Lithology
- Primary: Limestone
- Other: Mudstone

Location
- Coordinates: 31.1°N 111.6°E
- Region: Sichuan, Jiangxi, Chongqing, Hubei
- Country: China
- Extent: Sichuan Basin
- Jialingjiang Formation (China)

The Jialingjiang Formation (嘉陵江组) is a geologic feature associated with the Sichuan Basin of China, generally underlying the area of the basin, with its origins dating to the Early Triassic period of geologic time, around 249 million years ago. The Jialingjiang Formation is a geologic group feature upon the Yangtze Plate, which is a tectonic feature of the Earth's crust.

The Jialingjiang Formation is important to paleontologists or other people interested in ancient life forms due to the fossil evidence incorporated therein (such as for Eretmorhipis and other Ichthyosaur relatives). Also, scientific study of this formation group provides insight into Late Triassic tectonic inversion based on analysis of detrital zircon U–Pb chronology (involving the element uranium converting to lead over time due to radioactive decay). The Jialingjiang Formation is also of interest in history as it has been a source for humans to extract valuable economic goods such as salt and natural gas for many centuries.

== Hydrocarbon resources ==
The history of the Jialingjiang Formation explains the origins of the hydrocarbon resources which have historically or in the future may be extracted. The primary hydrocarbon resource of the Sichuan Basin is natural gas.

== Fossil contents ==
=== Invertebrates ===
Invertebrates of the Jialingjiang Formation
Genus	Species	Locality	Material	Notes	Images
Claraia	C. sp.	Longmendong, Sichuan	A specimen	A bivalve scallop	
Entolium	E. discites microtis				
Promysidiella	P. eduliformis praecursor				
Liuzhinia	L. parva	Longmendong, Sichuan	Several specimen	A bairdiidae ostracod	
Liuzhinia	L. subovata	Longmendong, Sichuan	Several specimen	A bairdiidae ostracod	
Liuzhinia	L. reniformis	Longmendong, Sichuan	Several specimen	A bairdiidae ostracod	
Myophoria	M. ovata			A bivalve mollusk	
Pteria	P. cf. murchisoni	Longmendong, Sichuan		A bivalve mollusk	

=== Vertebrates ===
==== Reptiles ====
Reptiles of the Jialingjiang Formation
Genus	Species	Locality	Material	Notes	Images
Chaohusaurus	C. zhangjiawanensis	Yuanan, Hubei	A relatively complete skeleton with skull and another skeleton lacking the skull.	An Ichthyosauriform	Hupehsuchus
Chusaurus	C. xiangensis	Songshugou Village, Hubei	A nearly complete skeleton lacking some cranial and cervical vertebral elements	A pachypleurosaurian nothosaur	Hupehsuchus
Eohupehsuchus	E. brevicollis	Yangping, Hubei	A skeleton	An aquatic short-necked hupehsuchia reptile	Hupehsuchus
Eretmorhipis	E. carrolldongi	Yuan'an County, Hubei	Multiple partially preserved skeletons	A marine hupehsuchian reptile	Hupehsuchus
Hanosaurus	H. hupehensis	Sonshugo locality and Yingzishan locality, Hubei	A partial skeleton	A marine reptile	Hupehsuchus
Hupehsuchus	H. nanchangensis	Quarry near Minfeng, Hubei	A skeleton	A hupehsuchian marine reptile	Hupehsuchus
Keichousaurus	K. yuananensis	Yingzishan Hill Quarry, Yichang	A partial skeleton	A pachypleurosaurian reptile	Hupehsuchus
Lariosaurus	L. sanxiaensis	Yingzishan Hill Quarry, Yichang	A holotype specimen consists of a skeleton	A nothosaur	Hupehsuchus
Lentamanusuchus	L. hubeiensis	Yingzishan Quarry, Yuan'an, Hubei	A partial articulated skeleton	A hupehsuchian ichthyosauromorph	Hupehsuchus
Nanchangosaurus	N. suni	Yangping, Yuan'an County, Hubei	A skeleton	A hupehsuchian marine reptile	Hupehsuchus
Parahupehsuchus	P. longus	Yuan'an County, Hubei	A partial skeleton	A hupehsuchian marine reptile	Hupehsuchus
Pomolispondylus	P. biani	Yingzishan Hill Quarry, Yichang	A partial skeleton	A sauropterygian reptile	Hupehsuchus
Prosaurosphargis	P. yingzishanensis	Yingzishan quarry, Hubei	A partial skeleton	A marine saurosphargid reptile	Hupehsuchus

==== Fish ====
Fish of the Jialingjiang Formation
Genus	Species	Locality	Material	Notes	Images
Saurichthys	S. sp.	Yuan'an County, Hubei		A saurichthyid saurichthyiform	

== See also ==
- 2020 in reptile paleontology
- Guanling Formation
- Hupehsuchia
- Zigong Salt History Museum
