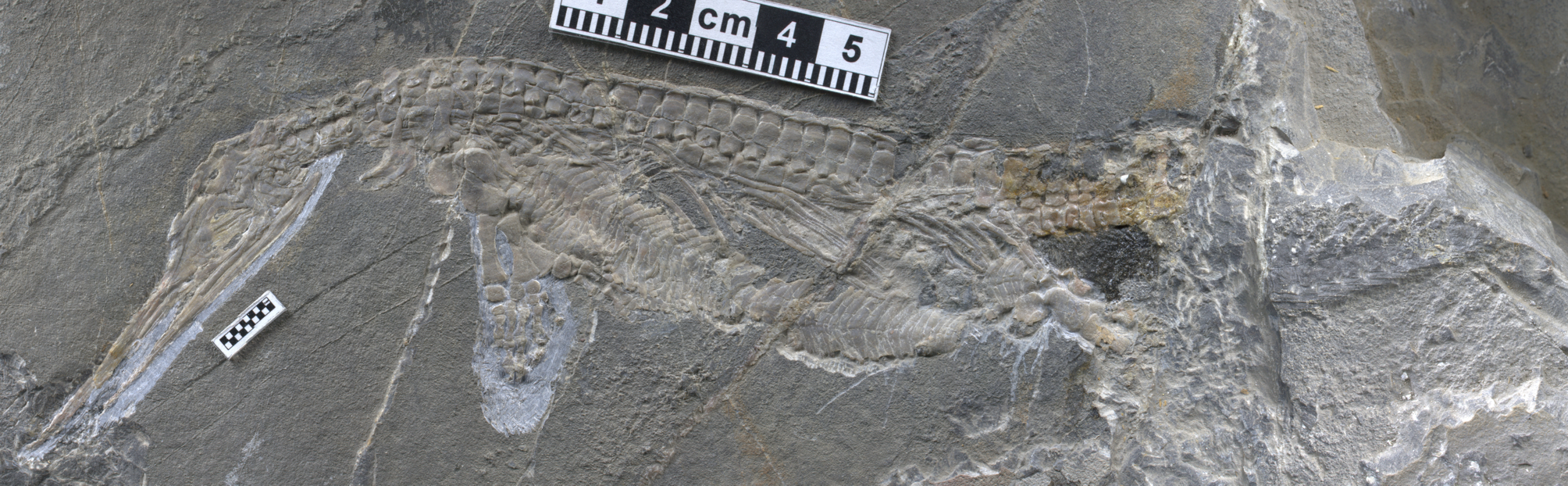
- Holotype specimen, WGSC V26003

Scientific classification
- Kingdom: Animalia
- Phylum: Chordata
- Order: †Hupehsuchia
- Genus: †Eohupehsuchus; Chen et al., 2014
- Species: †E. brevicollis

Binomial name
- †Eohupehsuchus brevicollis Chen et al., 2014

= Eohupehsuchus =

Eohupehsuchus Temporal range: Early Triassic 248–246 Ma

Extinct genus of reptiles

Eohupehsuchus is a genus of extinct aquatic diapsid from the Upper Spathian (latest Early Triassic) of Hubei Province, located in Central China. The genus is monotypic and belongs to the order Hupehsuchia, whose members are characterized by toothless beak-like snouts, a row of dermal plates along their backs, and aquatic adaptations including paddle-shaped limbs and fusiform bodies with pachyostotic ribs.

Eohupehsuchus is known only from its holotype, WGSC (Wuhan Centre of Geological Survey, China) V26003. It is the smallest known hupehsuchian along with Nanchangosaurus, measuring about 40 cm (16 in) long. Phylogenetic analyses have repeatedly recovered it as the second-most basal member of the Hupehsuchia and as the sister group to the family Hupehsuchidae. A pathology on the left forelimb of the holotype was interpreted by its discoverers as a bite wound from a larger marine reptile, and used to argue an early onset for modern trophic structures in marine ecosystems following the Permian-Triassic mass extinction (see Paleoenvironment and paleoecology).

The generic name Eohupehsuchus comes from the Greek "eos" (Greek: ἠώς), meaning "early" or "dawn;" "Hupeh," an anglicisation of Hubei (Chinese: 湖北; pinyin: Húběi); and the Greek "Soûchos" (Greek: Σοũχος), meaning "Sobek." (The Greek name for Sobek is a common element of scientific names for animals that resemble crocodiles, and is often translated as "crocodile" in this context, but hupehsuchians are not close relatives of crocodilians, the order that includes modern crocodiles.) The specific name brevicollis comes from the Latin "brevis," meaning "short," and "collum," meaning "neck." Thus the generic name can be translated as "early Hubei crocodile," and the full binomial name as "short-necked early Hubei crocodile."

== Discovery and history ==
WGSC V26003 was discovered in Yangping, a town in Yuan'an County in Hubei Province, Central China, and excavated by Chinese paleontologists Xiao-hong Chen and Long Cheng in 2011. Despite being exposed at the surface when discovered, the specimen is largely articulated and moderately complete, preserving much of the head, trunk, left pectoral girdle, and left forelimb, and parts of the left hindlimb and the anterior part of the tail. However, several of the preserved elements have been extensively damaged by erosion, including the left pelvic girdle, and other elements were completely destroyed by erosion before discovery, including the tips of the jaws.

The genus was named and formally diagnosed in a 2014 paper published in the open access journal PLOS One by paleontologists Xiao-hong Chen, Ryosuke Motani, Long Cheng, Da-yong Jiang, and Olivier Rieppel. It was the fourth hupehsuchian to be formally named, following Parahupehsuchus earlier in 2014, Hupehsuchus in 1972, and Nanchangosaurus in 1959, and the sixth hupehsuchian to be given a full formal description (Eretmorhipis was first described in 1991, but not named until 2015 after the discovery of better holotype material; a sixth taxon with polydactyly similar to that found in the earliest tetrapods was partially described in 2003, but has yet to be fully described or named).

== Description and paleobiology ==
=== Skull ===
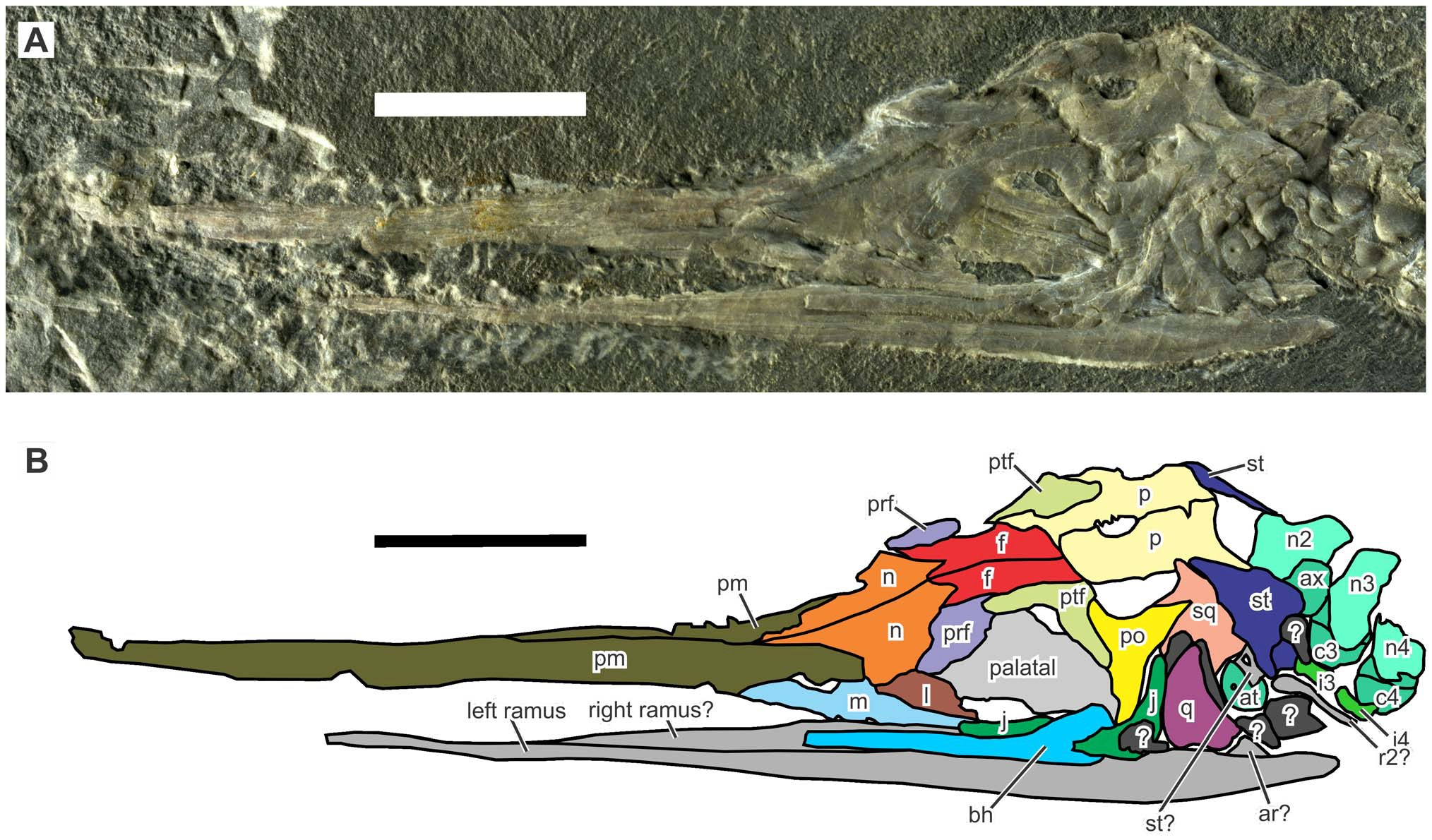
Top: the skull of the WGSC V260003. Bottom: annotated drawing of the skull, showing the rectangular frontals in red, and the posteriorly shifted parietal bones in pale yellow.

Like other hupehsuchians, Eohupehsuchus has a superficially bird-like skull, with an elongate, narrowly tapered, edentulous snout that contributes more than half of its total length. The genus is distinguished from other hupehsuchians in part by the shape and arrangement of bones in its skull roof: its parietal bones are further towards the back of the skull than those of Hupehsuchus and Nanchangosaurus, and its frontal bones are narrow and rectangular. In contrast, in Hupehsuchus and Nanchangasaurus, the lateral posterior parts of the frontals (i.e., the regions closest to the jaw joint) are tapered and extend towards the back of the skull. Based on orbit size, Eohupehsuchus was determined to have a smaller relative eye size than Nanchangosaurus, although sclerotic rings have not been found for either animal. Paleontologists have not reached a consensus on the function of the hupehsuchian "beak," although one paper argues it was used in lunge feeding, as in modern pelicans.

=== Spine and ribs ===
Eohupehsuchus has the shortest known neck among hupehsuchians, with a cervical series comprising only six vertebrae. The shortness of its neck is the basis of its specific epithet, brevicollis, and distinguishes it from other hupehsuchians, along with the features of the skull roof discussed above. Like other hupehsuchians, Eohupehsuchus has vertebrae with bipartite neural spines consisting of a first segment that begins above the base of the neural arch and a second segment that begins above the first. In Eohupehsuchus, the second segments appear throughout the dorsal series beginning with the third dorsal vertebra, and are absent in the sacral series. Whether or not they reappear in the caudal series is unknown. In common with Nanchangosaurus, the dorsal ribs of Eohupehsuchus are each marked by a longitudinal groove.

Like other hupehsuchians, Eohupehsuchus has a row of boomerang-shaped, overlapping gastral elements on each side of its trunk. In Eohupehsuchus, the width of the overlapping region is about one-third the width of the individual elements, and the trunk also has a third row of non-overlapping gastral elements along the midline.

=== Limbs ===
The limbs of Eohupehsuchus are similar to those of other hupehsuchians in the large size ratio of the distal elements (including the phalanges, the metacarpals and carpals in the forelimbs, and the metatarsals and tarsals in the hindlimbs) to the proximal elements (the radius and ulna in the forelimbs, and the tibia and fibula in the hindlimbs). This is a common feature of secondarily aquatic tetrapods in general, in which the limbs are adapted for steering and/or propulsion through water rather than walking and supporting the body against unidirectional gravity in a terrestrial environment. The left forelimb of the holotype shows fractures in the distal phalanges of the second and fourth digits and kinks in the distal phalanges of the first and third. Because the fractures and kinks run along a single line but do not extend into the matrix, and there are neither known fossils of scavengers from the assemblage where the specimen was found nor taphonomic evidence of scavenging in any other part of the carcass, the discoverers of Eohupehsuchus conclude that this pathology represents a bite wound from a predator.

=== Dermal plates ===
Like other hupehsuchians, Eohupehsuchus has a series of dermal plates or ossicles along the midline of its back. In Eohupehsuchus, these are arranged in three layers. The first are positioned directly above the neural spines, with one ossicle per vertebra beginning with the first dorsal vertebra and continuing into the anterior caudal series, and fusion of the ossicles and neural spines beginning with the third dorsal vertebra. The ossicles of the second layer are positioned in the spaces in between those of the first, beginning with the space in front of the first-layer ossicle of the ninth dorsal vertebra. The ossicles of the third layer are positioned above those of the second layer, and span the distance between adjacent neural spines beginning with the tenth and eleventh dorsal vertebrae.

== Paleoenvironment and paleoecology ==
The site in Yangping where Eohupehsuchus was discovered is an exposure of the Jialingjiang Formation, a laminated limestone sequence determined in a 2002 survey to be Olenekian in age (250.8 to 247 Ma according to the International Stratigraphic Commission). In their paper describing Eohupehsuchus, Chen et al. more specifically attribute the horizon of the holotype to the Upper Spathian (latest Olenekian). At this time, the South China plate, where the modern Jialingjiang Formation is found, was largely submerged on the eastern margin of the Paleo-Tethys Sea.

Eohupehsuchus is a member of the Nanzhang-Yuan'an fauna, which includes all animals discovered in the same part of the Jialingjiang Formation. This includes all known hupehsuchians, namely Nanchangosaurus, Eohupehsuchus, Parahupehsuchus, Hupehsuchus, Eretmorhipis, and the unnamed polydactylous taxon partially described in 2003. Eohupehsuchus was therefore coeval with up to five closely related animals in the Nanzhang-Yuan'an paleoenvironment. Chen et al. (2014) speculate that their coexistence may be explained by resource partitioning facilitated by body size disparity, dividing hupehsuchians into three distinct "size classes" with Nanchangosaurus and Eohupehsuchus sharing the smallest size class. The 2015 redescription of Eretmorhipis further elucidated hupehsuchian morphological disparity by establishing a spectrum of forelimb shapes, with the broad, fan-like "paddles" of Eretmorhipis on one end and the narrow, pointed "flippers" of Parahupehsuchus on the other. According to the authors, this diversity "further enhances morphological, and hence behavioral, variations among hupehsuchians" and "likely enabled hupehsuchians to divide resources, which allowed them, in turn, to have a high taxonomic diversity within a limited geographic area."

Other members of the Nanzhang-Yuan'an fauna include the basal ichthyopterygian Chaohusaurus zhangjiawanensis and the pachypleurosaurs Keichousaurus yuananensis and Hanosaurus hupehensis. Noting the presence of pachypleurosaurs and the absence of fish among the Nanzhang-Yuan'an fauna, the authors who named Parahupehsuchus suggested that as apex predators, the pachypleurosaurs were likely to have preyed on smaller marine reptiles, including hupehsuchians. According to the discoverers of Eohupehsuchus, the jaws of Hanosaurus hupehensis are sufficiently large to have caused the bite wound seen in the left forelimb of WGSC V26003, corroborating this picture of the assemblage's paleoecology. On this basis, they suggest that the trophic structure of modern marine ecosystems, in which the diet of apex predators includes secondarily aquatic tetrapods, was already present in the Early Triassic.
