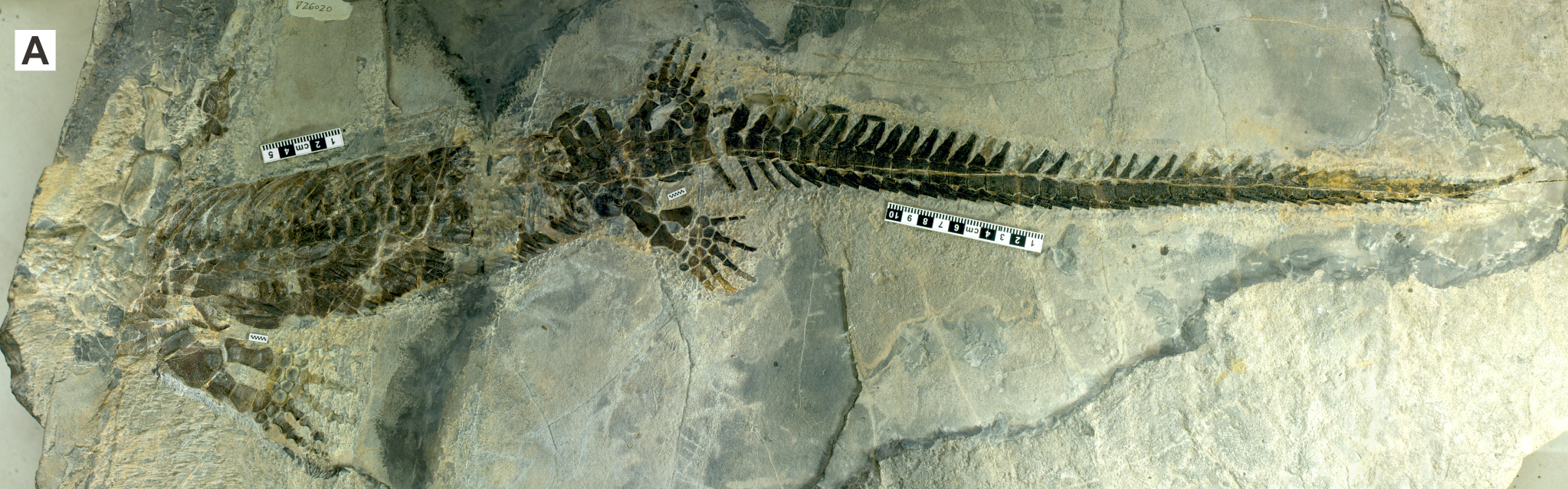
- The holotype specimen of Eretmorhipis carrolldongi, WGSC V26020

Scientific classification
- Kingdom: Animalia
- Phylum: Chordata
- Class: Reptilia
- Order: †Hupehsuchia
- Family: †Hupehsuchidae
- Genus: †Eretmorhipis; Chen et al., 2015

Type species
- †Eretmorhipis carrolldongi Chen et al., 2015

= Eretmorhipis =

Eretmorhipis Temporal range: Early Triassic 248–246 Ma

Extinct genus of reptiles

Eretmorhipis (meaning "oar fan" from the Greek ἐρετμόν, "oar", and ῥιπίς, "fan") is an extinct genus of hupehsuchian marine reptiles from the Early Triassic of China. It is currently known from two specimens that were discovered in an exposure of the Jialingjiang Formation in Yuan'an County, Hubei, and referred to the newly named species Eretmorhipis carrolldongi in 2015.

Eretmorhipis carrolldongi is noted for its exceptionally small eyes relative to the body, platypus-like snout, and plates on its back "like a stegosaurus."

One of those specimens, the holotype WGSC V26020, had been known since 1991 and consists of the entire skeleton excluding the skull. The second specimen, IVPP V4070, is an impression of the right side of the back half of the skeleton, as well as part of the right fore limb. Two more specimens were discovered in 2018 at the same location, one of which is almost complete and includes the skull.

== Description ==
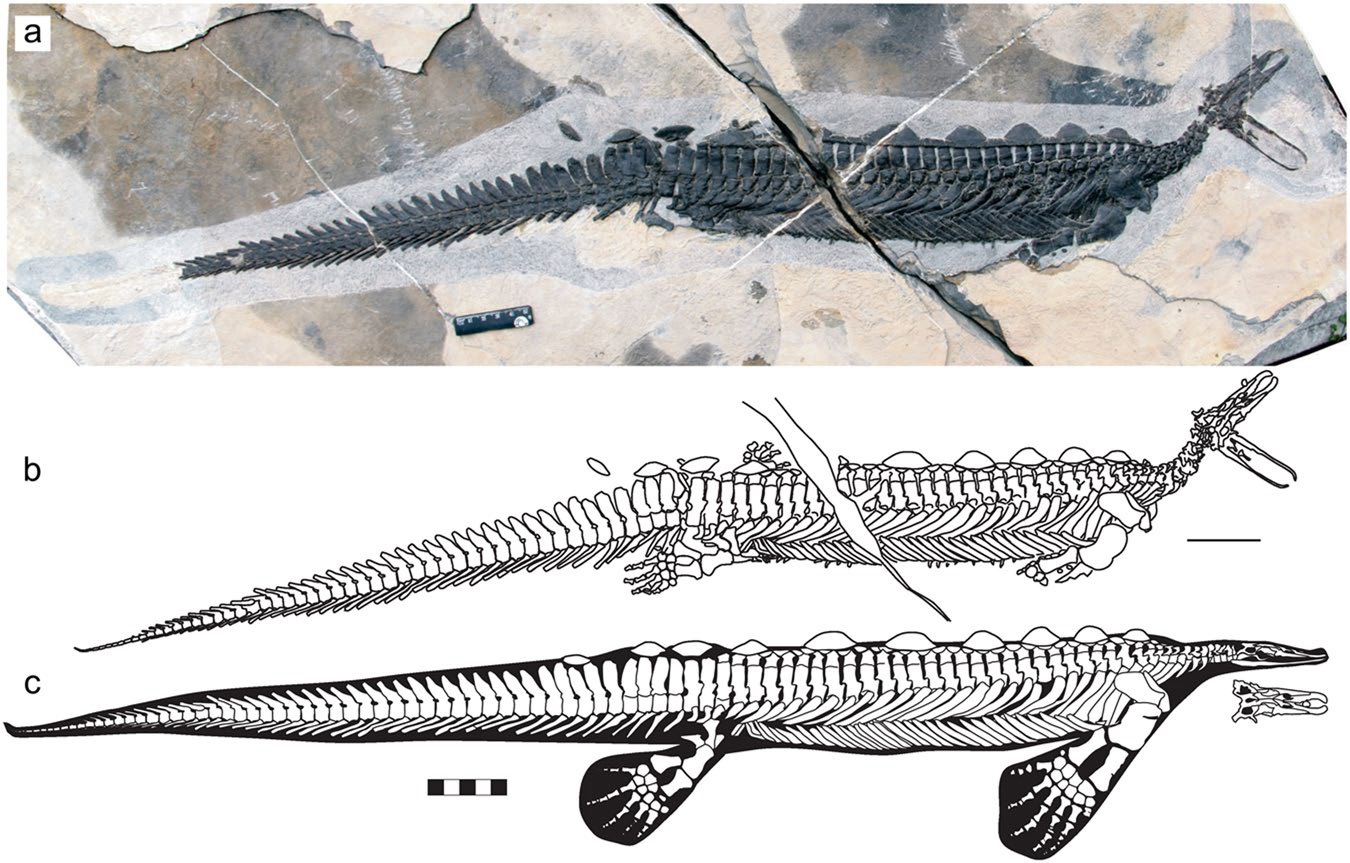
Nearly complete assigned specimen

Eretmorhipis was a relatively small reptile, with the second specimen IVPP V4070 measuring about 1 m (3.3 ft) in total body length. It is unique among hupehsuchians in having manual and pedal digits that radiate in a fan-like shape. Like other hupehsuchians, it has three overlapping layers of armor-like osteoderms over its spine, but the osteoderms of the uppermost layer are significantly larger than they are in other hupehsuchians, each spanning the length of four vertebrae. These upper-layer osteoderms are also widely spaced. The torso of Eretmorhipis is elongated and encased in a bony tube formed from thickened ribs and gastralia, similar to the bony tube of the hupehsuchian Parahupehsuchus, but less extensive.

== Discovery ==
The first specimen, discovered in the 1991, was missing a head. The next, more complete, fossils were found in 2015 by Wong Cheng of the Wuhan Center of China Geological Survey.

University of California, Davis paleobiologist Ryosuke Motani told The New York Times that the animal's odd features initially stunned him: "When I first saw it, I just said 'What?!' and didn't speak for a while."

== Classification ==
The authors of the 2015 paper that named Eretmorhipis performed a phylogenetic analysis and found that it was one of the most derived hupehsuchians, forming a clade that they called the Parahupehsuchinae with Parahupehsuchus and an unnamed polydactylous hupehsuchian. Below is a cladogram from their analysis:

- - Hovasaurus
  - - - Cartorhynchus
      - Chaohusaurus
    - Hupehsuchia
      - Nanchangosaurus
      - - Eohupehsuchus
        - Hupehsuchidae
          - Hupehsuchus
          - Parahupehsuchinae
            - Parahupehsuchus
            - - Polydactylous hupehsuchian
              - Eretmorhipis
