= Pessosaurus =

Pessosaurus Temporal range: Middle Triassic

Scientific classification
- Domain: Eukaryota
- Kingdom: Animalia
- Phylum: Chordata
- Class: Reptilia
- Order: †Ichthyosauria
- Genus: †Pessosaurus; Wiman, 1910

Extinct genus of reptiles

Pessosaurus is an extinct genus of ichthyosaurs which existed during the Middle Triassic period.

There are two species:

- Pessosaurus polaris Hulke, 1873
- Pessosaurus suevicus Huene, 1916

== See also ==
- List of ichthyosaurs
- Timeline of ichthyosaur research
