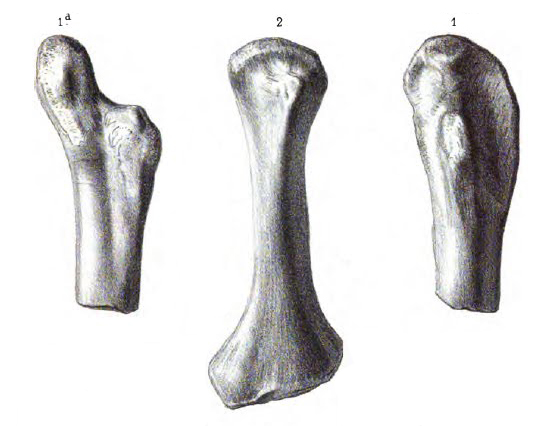
- Actiosaurus gaudryi humerus (anterior view), Sauvage (1883).

Scientific classification
- Kingdom: Animalia
- Phylum: Chordata
- Class: Reptilia
- Genus: †Actiosaurus; Sauvage, 1883
- Species: †A. gaudryi

Binomial name
- †Actiosaurus gaudryi Sauvage, 1883

= Actiosaurus =

Actiosaurus Temporal range: Late Triassic, Rhaetian

Extinct genus of reptiles

Actiosaurus (meaning "coast lizard") is an extinct genus of reptile first described by Henri Sauvage in 1883 from Antully bonebed, Autun (Triassic of France). The type species is A. gaudryi (commonly misspelled A. gaudrii after Boulenger). Little is known of it, and it is considered a nomen dubium. Actiosaurus was originally described as a dinosaur in 1883 and was reinterpreted as an ichthyosaur in 1908. Actiosaurus may instead represent the remains of a choristodere. Fischer et al. (2014) considered A. gaudryi to be a species inquirenda, and noted the similarity of its bones to the limb bones of choristoderes.

== See also ==
- Rachitrema
- List of ichthyosaurs
- Timeline of ichthyosaur research
