= Svalbardosaurus =

Scientific classification
- Kingdom: Animalia
- Phylum: Chordata
- Superclass: Tetrapoda
- Genus: Svalbardosaurus Mazin, 1981
- Species: S. crassidens

Binomial name
- Svalbardosaurus crassidens Mazin, 1981

Extinct genus of reptiles

Svalbardosaurus is a genus from the Lower Triassic, initially identified as an ichthyosaur but later reinterpreted as an amphibian.

The type species is Svalbardosaurus crassidens, named and described by Jean-Michel Mazin in 1981. The generic name refers to the Svalbard archipelago, of which Spitsbergen is a part, where the remains have been found. The specific name means "thick tooth" in Latin. The genus is solely based on some conical teeth and often considered a nomen dubium.

== See also ==
- List of ichthyosaurs
- Timeline of ichthyosaur research
