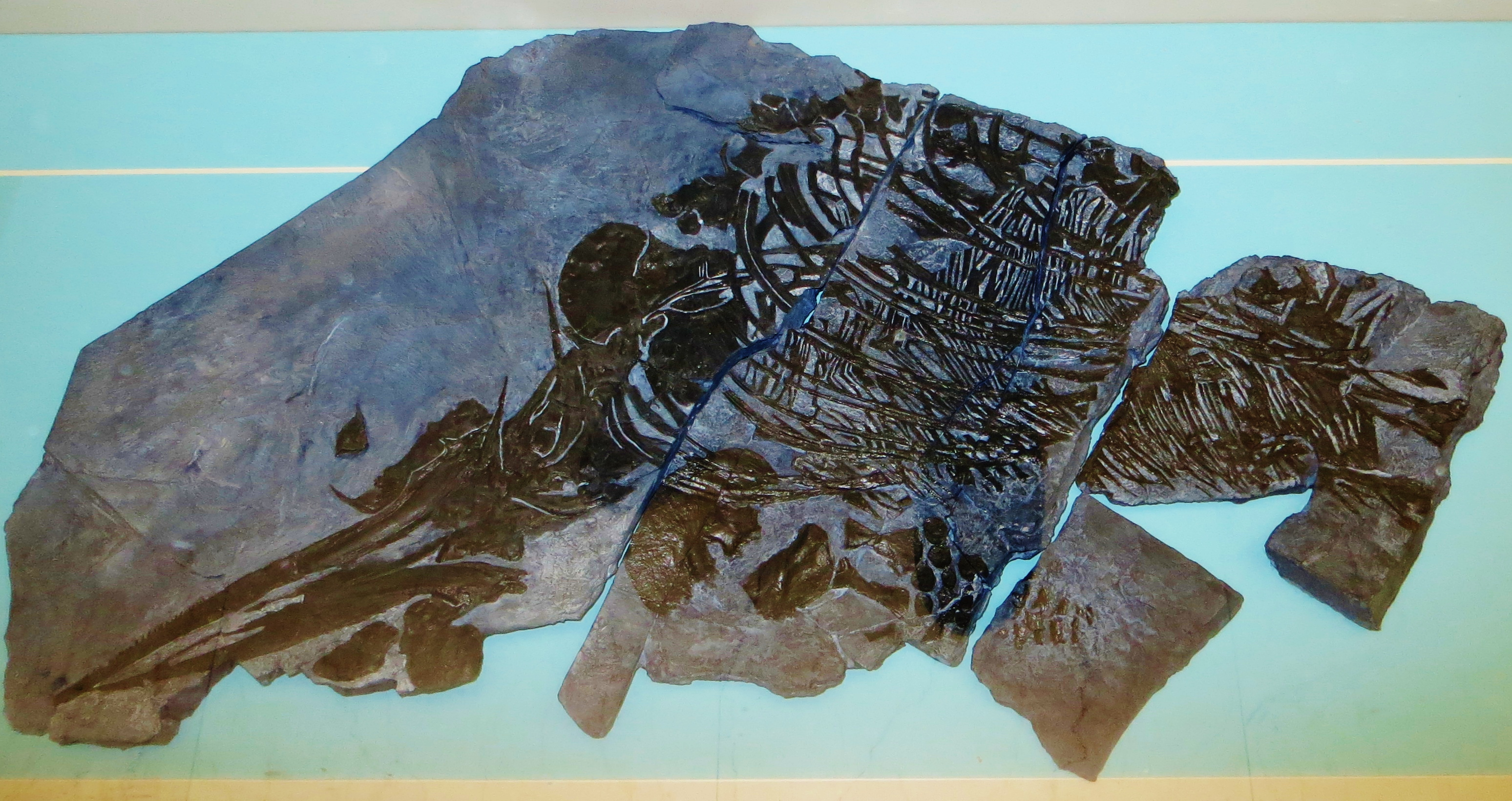
- Fossil

Scientific classification
- Kingdom: Animalia
- Phylum: Chordata
- Class: Reptilia
- Superorder: †Ichthyopterygia
- Family: †Utatsusauridae; McGowan & Motani, 2003
- Genus: †Utatsusaurus; Shikama et al., 1978

Type species
- †Utatsusaurus hataii Shikama et al., 1978

= Utatsusaurus =

Utatsusaurus Temporal range: Early Triassic, 248–245 Ma

Extinct genus of reptiles

Utatsusaurus hataii is the earliest-known ichthyopterygian which lived in the Early Triassic period (c. 245–250 million years ago). It was nearly 2.5–3 metres (8.2–9.8 ft) long with a slender body. The first specimen was found in Utatsu-cho (now part of Minamisanriku-cho), Miyagi Prefecture, Japan. It is the only described species in the genus Utatsusaurus and the only member of the family Utatsusauridae. The name Utatsusaurus was given after the city. The fossils have been found from the Early Triassic Osawa Formation of Miyagi Prefecture, Japan and British Columbia, Canada.

Utatsusaurus is one of the most primitive grades of ichthyosaurs, a basal ichthyosaur.

== Description ==
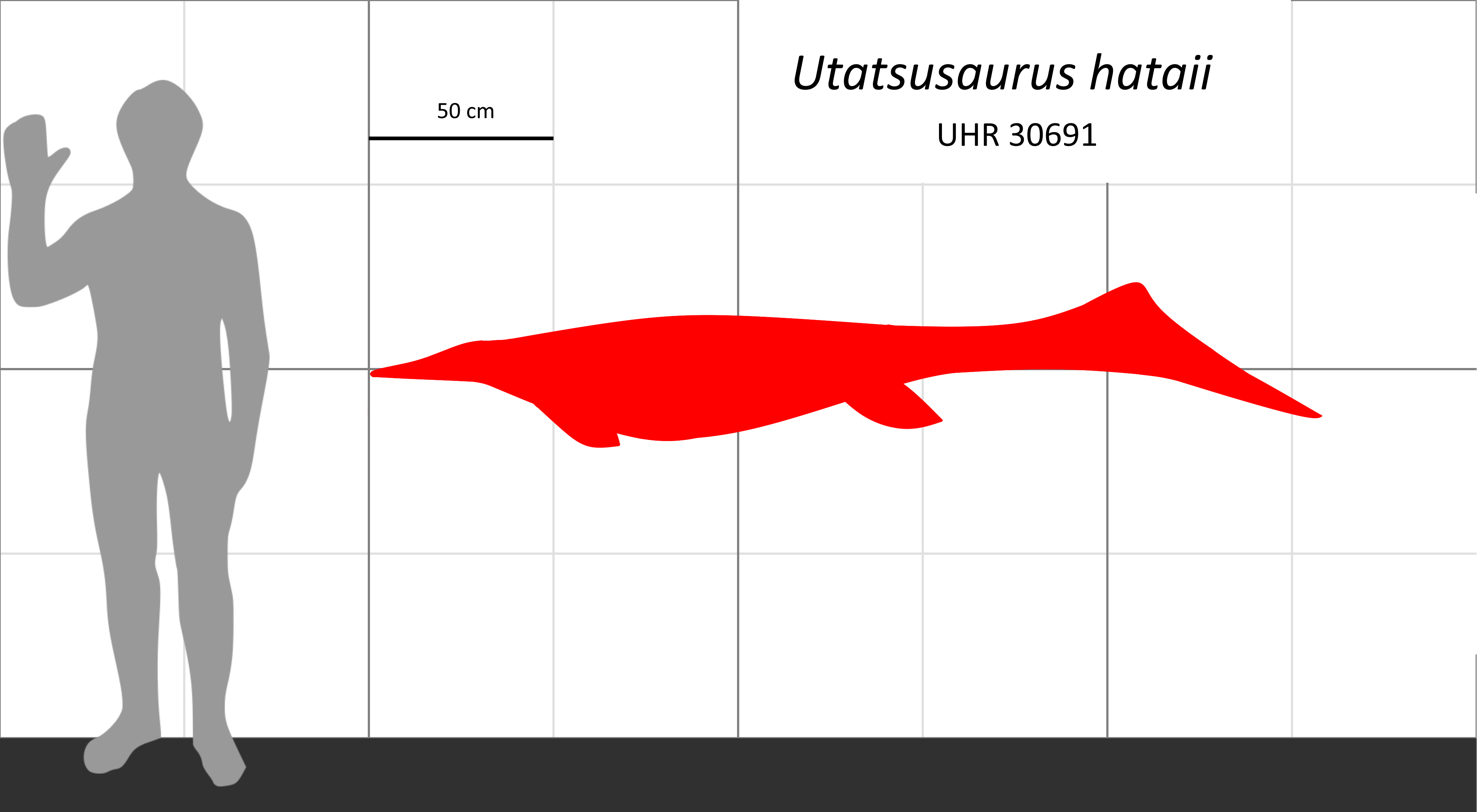
Utatsusaurus with a human to scale.

Utatsusaurus was a relatively small ichthyopterygian, measuring 2.5–3 m (8.2–9.8 ft) long and weighing 57.8 kg (127 lb). Unlike the more advanced ichthyosaurs, Utatsusaurus has no dorsal fin and has a broad skull. The snout gently tapers, compared to the more rounded one of more derived ichthyopterygians. The postorbital underlaps the elongate posterior process of the postfrontal. This is an evident plesiomorphic condition for ichthyopterygians. For the size of the skull, the teeth are rather small, and arranged in a primitive groove. They have longitudinal grooves and were first thought to be longer and more acute than Grippia, which is a closely related ichthyosaur. But, after that, it was reported that they were rather bluntly pointed and robust by reexamining the holotype. Utatsusaurus had small fins, with five digits. In addition, those digits have up to five extra finger bones, which is referred to as hyperphalangy. The tail had a long low fin, suggesting that the animal swam by undulation, rather than using its paddles and tail.

Utatsusaurus has transitional features between ancestral terrestrial amniotes and the more derived ichthyosaurs. First, the attachment of the pelvic girdle to the vertebral column was probably not robust enough to support the body on land unlike terrestrial amniotes. The pelvic girdle is attached to the vertebral column by the sacral ribs probably articulating with the ilium, but the ribs are not fused to the sacral vertebrae. Second, the humerus and femur of Utatsusaurus has the equal length. While all other ichthyosaurs have the longer humerus, terrestrial amniotes have the longer femur. Furthermore, the hindlimb of Utatsusaurus seems to be larger than the forelimb. They also used phylogenetic analyses and concluded that ichthyosaurs were a member of the Diapsida and the sister group of the Sauria.

== Paleobiology ==
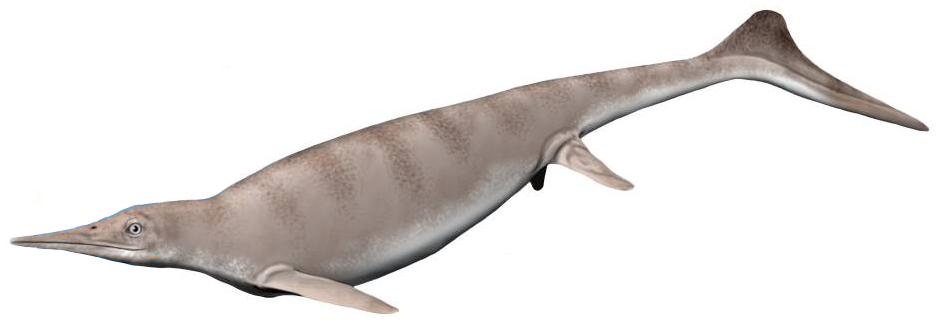
Restoration

Utatsusaurus fed on a diet of fish.

It has approximately 40 presacral vertebrae which are cylindrical, suggesting that it probably swam with an eel-like motion.

== Classification ==
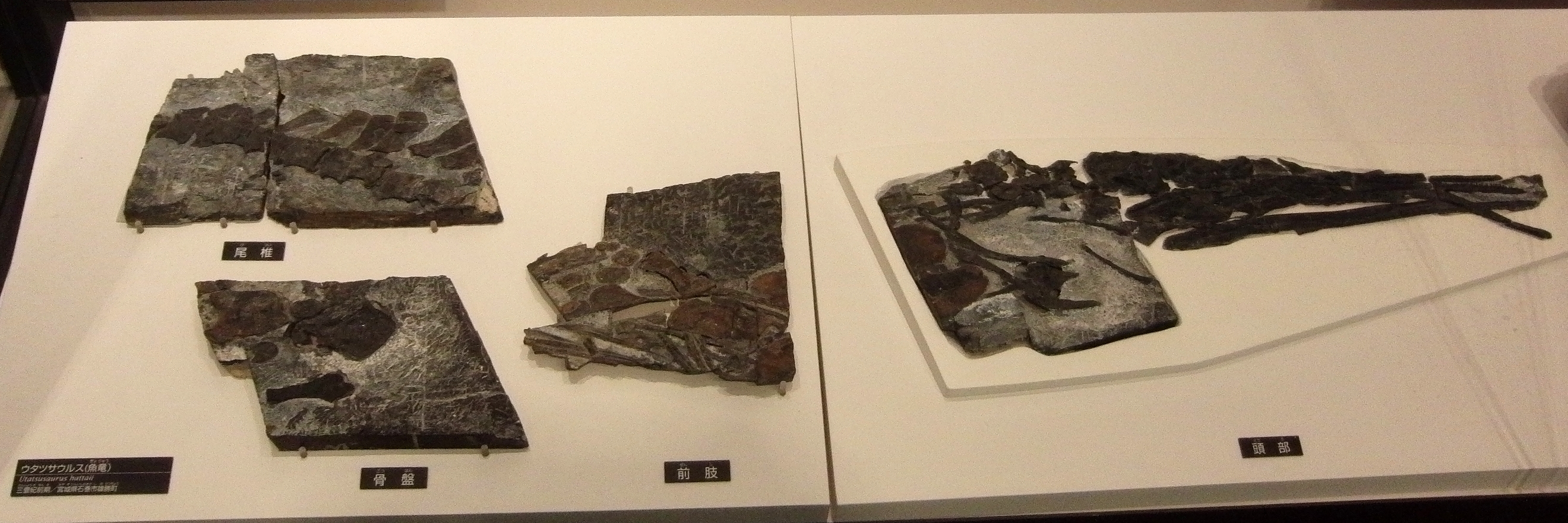
Fossil of Utatsusaurus hataii. Exhibit in the National Museum of Nature and Science, Tokyo.

Ryosuke Motani from the University of California, Berkeley, and Nachio Minoura and Tatsuro Ando from Hokkaido University re-examined the fossils of Utatsusaurus in 1998 using computer imagery to reverse the distortion of the original skeleton. They found that Utatsusaurus was closely related to the lizard-like diapsid reptiles such as Petrolacosaurus, making ichthyopterygians a distant relative to lizards, snakes and crocodiles. They also used phylogenetic analyses and concluded that ichthyosaurs were a member of the Diapsida and the sister group of the Sauria.Additionally, in 2013, Cuthbertson and colleagues from the University of Calgary, Canada, using phylogenetic analyses, reported that Ichthyopterygia is a monophyletic group and Utatsusaurus and Parvinatator are a basal clade.

Utatsusaurus in a cladogram after Huang et al., 2019:

- Ichthyosauromorpha
  - Hupehsuchia
  - Ichthyosauriformes
    - Nasorostra
      - Sclerocormus
      - Cartorhynchus
    - - Chaohusaurus
      - Ichthyopterygia
        - Grippidia
          - Parvinatator
          - - Utatsusaurus
            - - Grippia
              - Gulosaurus
        - Ichthyosauria
          - Cymbospondylidae
          - Hueneosauria

== Destruction of the Gyoryū-kan ==
Minamisanriku-cho, Japan is a renowned place which has yielded a number of fossils of ichthyosaurs and the holotype specimen of Utatsusaurus. A museum (called Gyoryū-kan (魚竜館), literally translating as "a house of fish-dragons") was built to keep and display those fossils, and over sixty thousand people had visited there a year. However, on Friday 11 March 2011, the museum was destroyed during the 2011 Tōhoku earthquake and tsunami. At the time of the earthquake, the fossils of Utatsusaurus were kept at another place, and the majority of the other fossils displayed at the museum were salvaged, but the museum, itself has not yet been restored and reopened.

== See also ==
- List of ichthyosaurs
- List of ichthyosaur type specimens
- Timeline of ichthyosaur research

== Sources ==
- Dixon, Dougal (2006). The Complete Book of Dinosaurs. Hermes House.
