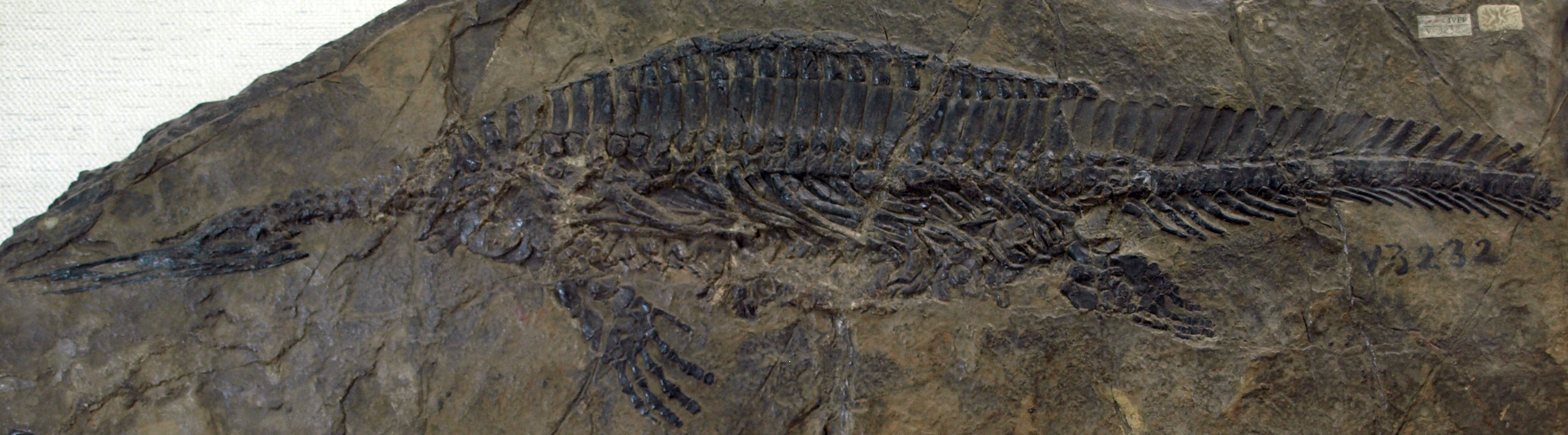
- Hupehsuchus nanchangensis on display at the Paleozoological Museum of China

Scientific classification
- Kingdom: Animalia
- Phylum: Chordata
- Class: Reptilia
- Clade: Parapleurota
- Clade: Neodiapsida
- Clade: †Ichthyosauromorpha
- Order: †Hupehsuchia; Young & Dong, 1972

Genera
- †Eohupehsuchus; †Nanchangosaurus; †Hupesuchidae; †Hupehsuchus; †Lentamanusuchus; †Parahupehsuchinae; †Eretmorhipis; †Parahupehsuchus

= Hupehsuchia =

Hupehsuchia Temporal range: Early Triassic, 248–247.2 Ma

Extinct order of reptiles

Hupehsuchia is an order of diapsid reptiles closely related to ichthyosaurs. The group was short-lasting, with a temporal range restricted to the late Olenekian age, spanning only a few million years of the Early Triassic. The order gets its name from Hubei Province, China, from which many specimens have been found. They are probable members of the clade Ichthyosauromorpha.

== Description ==
Hupehsuchians display an unusual combination of characteristics. The overall shape of the body is fusiform, with a long tail and large, paddle-like limbs. The skull is elongated and the jaws are edentulous. The rostrum is flattened with the premaxilla thought to form most of the dorsal and lateral surface, while the maxilla is mostly restricted to the ventral surface beyond the base of the rostrum. An opening between the nasal and the prefrontal bones in one hupehsuchian specimen (known as IVPP V3232) was initially interpreted as an antorbital fenestra, but is now thought to be an artifact caused by the damage of the surrounding bones during preservation. Its position is not indicative of a narial opening, either. More likely, the naris lies between the nasal and the maxilla in an area anterior to that of the supposed antorbital fenestra, although the preservation of this area in known specimens is too poor to prove definitively that it is the external naris and not an artifact of preservation, as is the case for the fenestra.

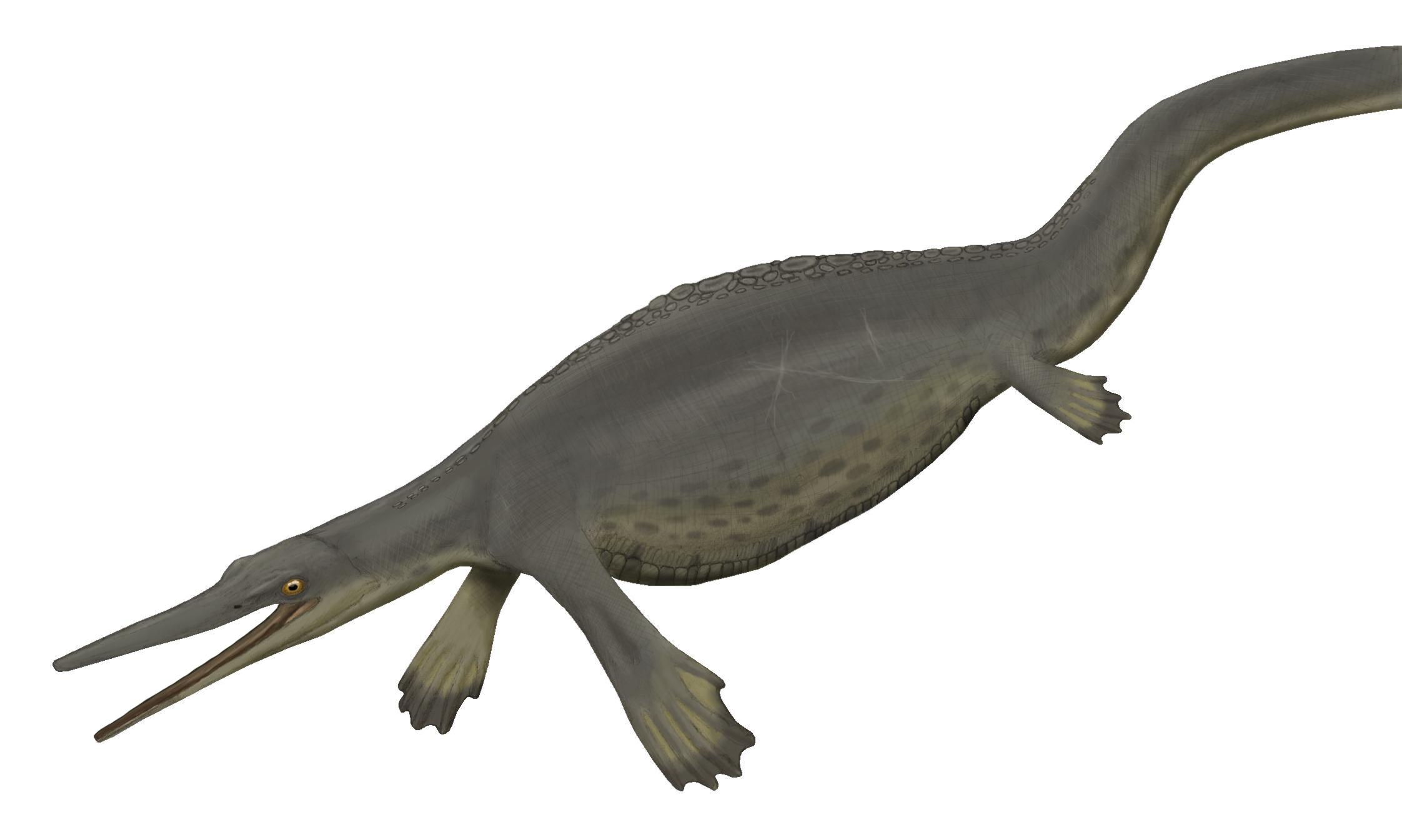
Life restoration of Hupehsuchus nanchangensis

The neck is relatively elongated and the cervical ribs are short. An unusual feature of the neural spines of the trunk region, from the 11 vertebra to the first caudal, is that each is divided into two distinct units by a suture line. One is proximal to the rest of the vertebra and the other is distal to it. Some anteroposterior displacement of these two units occurs along the vertebral column, suggesting they are not ossified to one another. In vertebrae 8-14, the distal ends of the distal portions of the neural spines are expanded posteriorly. An additional anterior expansion of the neural spine is seen in all vertebrae after the 14th. These expanded distal regions exhibit some sculpturing, and may have penetrated the dermis. Another unusual characteristic of hupehsuchians is the presence of dermal plates over the neural spines of the approximately 34 presacral vertebrae. A small dermal bone overlies each space between the posterior expansion of one distal neural spine and the anterior expansion of the one behind it. Above these dermal bones lie even larger dermal plates that directly overlie even numbered neural spines.

Gastralia are present in some specimens that form a type of ventral armor from the pectoral to the pelvic girdle. The medial row consists of large, overlapping, V-shaped elements, and lateral rows consist of smaller, cylindrical, widely spaced bones.

== Genera ==
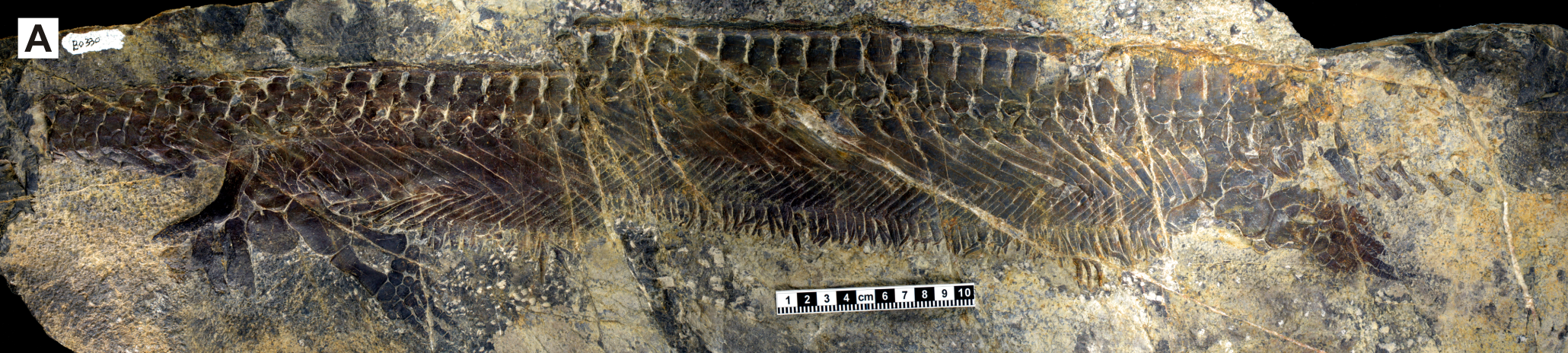
Holotype of Parahupehsuchus

Only five named genera of hupehsuchians are known. All come from the Jialingjiang Formation in Hubei Province, China. Geologists originally dated the Jialingjiang Formation to the Anisian stage of the Middle Triassic, but it is now thought to date back slightly earlier to the late Olenekian stage of the Early Triassic. The first described hupehsuchian was Nanchangosaurus, named in 1959. A single skeleton of Nanchangosaurus suni (the only species within the genus) have been found from the Daye Limestone in the Hsunjian District of Hubei Province from a single specimen. Another genus, Hupehsuchus, was named in 1972 from a locality in the Xunjian Commune of Nanzhang County. Nanchangosaurus and Hupehsuchus do not differ greatly, and were probably quite similar in appearance. Nanchangosaurus possesses a frontal that participates in the orbital margin and is quite long, more similar to what is seen in basal diapsids. Additionally, the dorsal plates lack sculpturing. In Hupehsuchus, the zygapophyses of the trunk region are more modified, while those of Nanchangosaurus resemble those of more primitive terrestrial reptiles. Overall, Nanchangosaurus was smaller in size than Hupehsuchus, and although several characteristics of the single representative specimen of the former genus suggest it belonged to a juvenile individual, other differences between the two genera are clearly not ontogeneic and dispel the possibility that the single specimen of Nanchangosaurus could represent an immature Hupehsuchus. Different means of preservation can also be taken as evidence for different body forms in the two genera. All specimens of Hupehsuchus are preserved in lateral view, while the single specimen of Nanchangosaurus is preserved in dorsal view (except for the neural spines, which were probably too long to be preserved in this manner). Hupehsuchus possibly had a more laterally compressed body than Nanchangosaurus, which, as a result, would favor preservation in lateral view. A third genus, Parahupehsuchus, was named in 2014 from the Jialingjiang Formation and differs from both Nanchangosaurus and Hupehsuchus in having a more elongated body. It has a series of broad, flattened ribs that abut each other and connect with closely packed gastralia on the underside of the body, forming a bony tube encasing the torso. A fourth genus, Eohupehsuchus, was also described in 2014 and had a shorter neck than other genera, with only six cervical vertebrae.

=== Unnamed genera ===
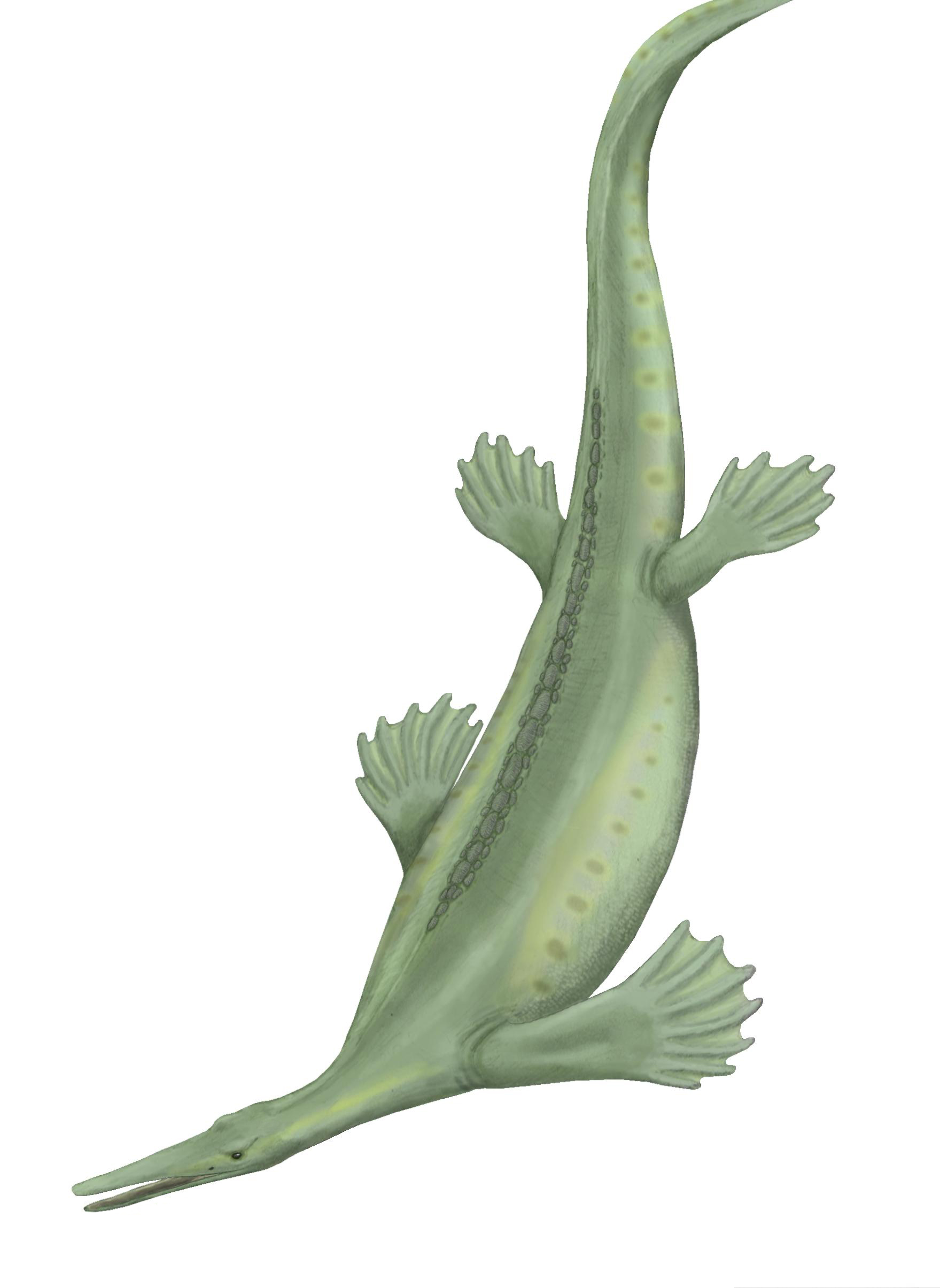
Life restoration of a polydactylous hupehsuchian based on SSTM 5025

In late 2003, a new specimen of hupehsuchian called SSTM 5025, found from the same area as Hupehsuchus and Eretmorhipis, was briefly mentioned in the journal Nature. It is most notable for exhibiting polydactyly, in which more than the usual maximum of five digits per limb were seen as in most advanced tetrapods. Polydactyly is also seen in ichthyosaurs. However, in ichthyosaurs, this condition occurs as either bilateral polydactyly in the case of ophthalmosaurids (extra digits anterior to digit I and posterior to digit V) or interdigital or postaxial phalangeal bifurcation as in non-ophthalmosaurids. Preaxial polydactyly occurs in SSTM 5025, where extra digits only develop anteriorly to digit I. This condition is seen in earlier stem tetrapods from the Devonian period, such as Ichthyostega and Acanthostega. SSTM 5025 possessed seven digits on the forelimbs and six on the hindlimbs. The wide manus and pes of the specimen resemble the limb-like fins of extant frogfishes. In 2019, SSTM 5025 is described as Nanchangosaurus.

== Taxonomy and phylogenetics ==
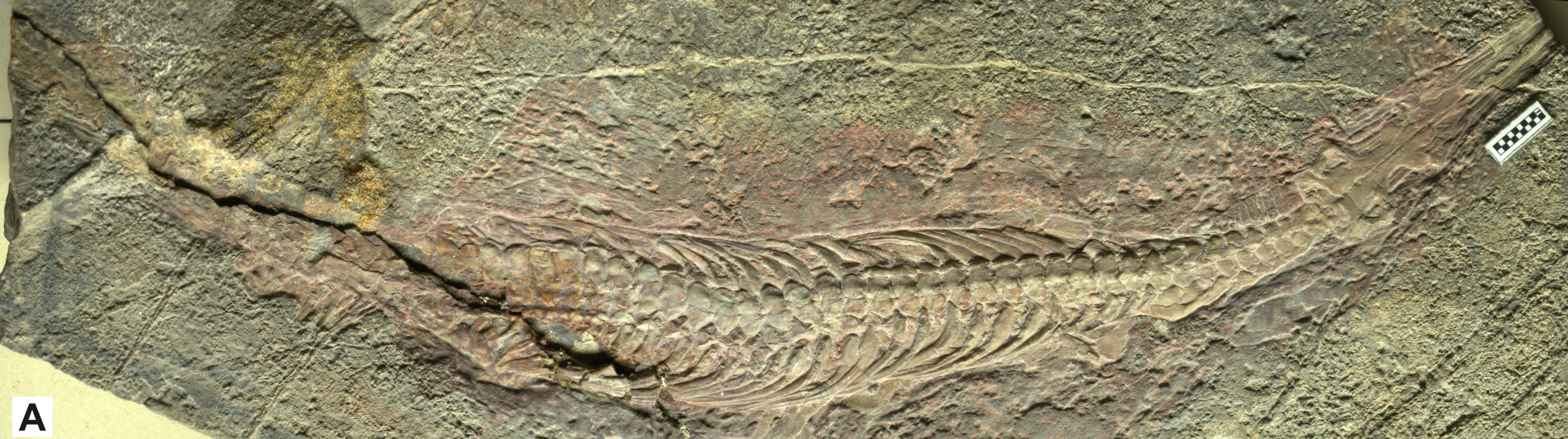
Nanchangosaurus holotype

Hupehsuchia was first defined as a suborder of "Thecodontia" in 1972, when it was first thought to be a group of early archosaurs. It was also thought to be related to several other groups of Triassic reptiles previously thought to be clearly distinct. The presence of the supposed antorbital fenestra described above was seen as evidence for grouping hupesuchians within Archosauria, but the antorbital fenestra characteristic of archosaurs is surrounded by the maxilla and lacrimal, not the nasal and prefrontal bones. The dermal plates were also seen as evidence for terrestrial archosaur ancestors, and comparisons were made with some early armored forms. However, a later study in 1976 could find no similarities between the dermal plates of hupehsuchians and the armor of early archosaurs. The ancestors of hupehsuchians more likely were earlier, more basal terrestrial diapsids, as suggested by several synapomorphies they share with such primitive ancestors. In 1991, Hupehsuchia was recognized as a distinct order after better methods of specimen preparation allowed new features to be revealed that distinguished Hupehsuchia from all other diapsid orders.

The assumed position of the naris in hupehsuchians as explained above can be taken as evidence for possible ichthyosaurian affinities, as it is in the same general area as those of ichthyosaurs. Hupehsuchians do resemble earlier ichthyosaurs in outward appearance with slightly fusiform bodies and long, straight, non-lunate tails. Other features shared with ichthyosaurs include a supraoccipital similar to what is seen in early forms, a relatively long antorbital region, and a short transverse process for the ribs. Many more differences exist between hupehsuchians and ichthyosaurs, however. In hupehsuchians, the surfaces of the vertebral centra that articulate with one another are distinctively flat, or acelous, while in ichthyosaurs they are noticeably heterocelous (it is also important to note that the surfaces of centra in the possible early diapsid ancestors of hupehsuchians were amphicelous). However, there are some early ichthyosaurs and ichthyosaur relatives such as Chaohusaurus and Utatsusaurus that possess vertebrae that are not deeply heterocoelus and more closely resemble those of hupehsuchians. Unlike more derived ichthyosaurs, the centra of these two genera are about as long as they are high. In hupehsuchians, where the neural arches dominate the vertebral column, the height of the centra is reduced and the height to length ratio of the centra is smaller, meaning that they are also about as long as they are high. This may suggest that hupehsuchians may have evolved from an ichthyosaur relative. It has also been suggested that hupehsuchians were related to or members of Sauropterygia. Indeed, Nanchangosaurus was classified as a sauropterygian upon its initial description.

Many of the features seen in known hupehsuchian specimens that are comparable to those of more well known diapsids may not necessarily be evidence of ancestry or relationship. The lower jaw and rostrum of hupehsuchians have been compared to many other secondarily aquatic tetrapods such as plesiosaurs, whales, and the early marine bird Hesperornis, all of which have developed a similar morphology independently in response to the need for adaptation to a marine environment.

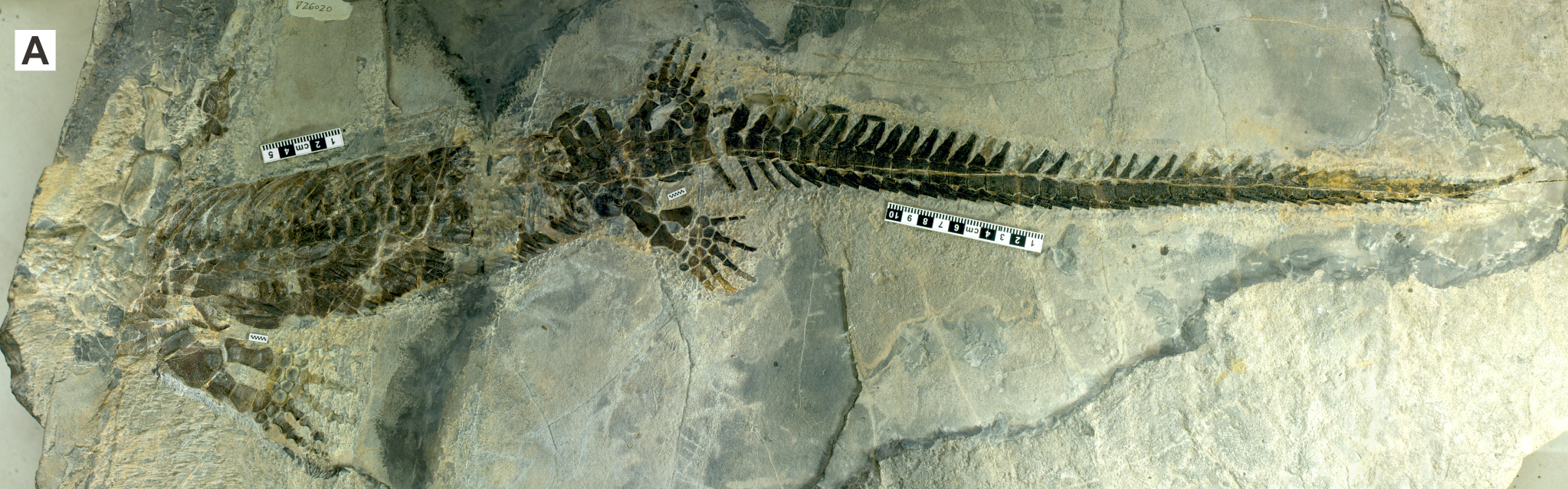
Eretmorhipis holotype

Classification of Hupehsuchia remains difficult because most of the derived characters exhibited in the clade that can be helpful in phylogenetic analyses are also present in other unrelated groups of secondarily aquatic reptiles, and the overall record of diapsids during the Late Permian-Early Triassic is relatively poor, making it difficult to find any closely related or ancestral taxa. Even higher level classification is difficult because many of the plesiomorphies that characterize such groups are absent in the highly derived, marine adapted hupehsuchians. For example, several characteristics suggest that Hupehsuchia belongs within Neodiapsida, but most of the derived characteristics that define the clade are absent or hard to distinguish in hupehsuchians, even though their ancestors may have possessed these characteristics at one point. Three derived characteristics of Neodiapsida are a reduced number of teeth on the pterygoid, an absence of teeth on the parasphenoid, and a lack of caniniform maxillary teeth, but none of these apply to hupehsuchians because they lack teeth altogether. Many derived characteristics that define neodiapsids regard the limbs and girdles, but these characteristics are not seen in marine reptiles because the limbs and girdles are too highly modified. Many characteristics of the skull cannot be seen in hupehsuchians due to poor preservation of remains. Therefore, any placement of Hupehsuchia within Neodiapsida remains tentative until more specimens are found.

Due to the great number of derived characteristics in hupehsuchians that are a result of convergence, computational phylogenetic analyses using computer programs based on the method of maximum parsimony do not produce cladograms that can accurately establish a relationship between hupehsuchians and other diapsids. However, such techniques can be used to study interrelationships within Hupehsuchia. A 2014 phylogenetic analysis found a sister group relationship between Parahupehsuchus and IVPP V4070, with Hupehsuchus and Nanchangosaurus as successively more basal taxa within Hupehsuchia. The authors of this analysis chose to name the Hupehsuchus+(Parahupehsuchus+IVPP V4070) clade Hupehsuchidae, excluding Nanchangosaurus from the group. In 2015 the taxon Eretmorhipis was described for IVPP V4070 and WGSC V26020, and found to be closely related to Parahupehsuchus. An updated version of this matrix was used in the 2025 description of the hupehsuchian Lentamanusuchus, the results of which are displayed in the cladogram below:

- Ichthyosauromorpha
  - Ichthyosauriformes
  - Hupehsuchia
    - Nanchangosaurus
    - - Eohupehsuchus
      - Hupehsuchidae
        - Hupehsuchus
        - - Lentamanusuchus
          - Parahupehsuchinae
            - Parahupehsuchus
            - - Eretmorhipis
              - HFUT YZSB-19-141 Parahupehsuchinae indet.

== Paleobiology ==
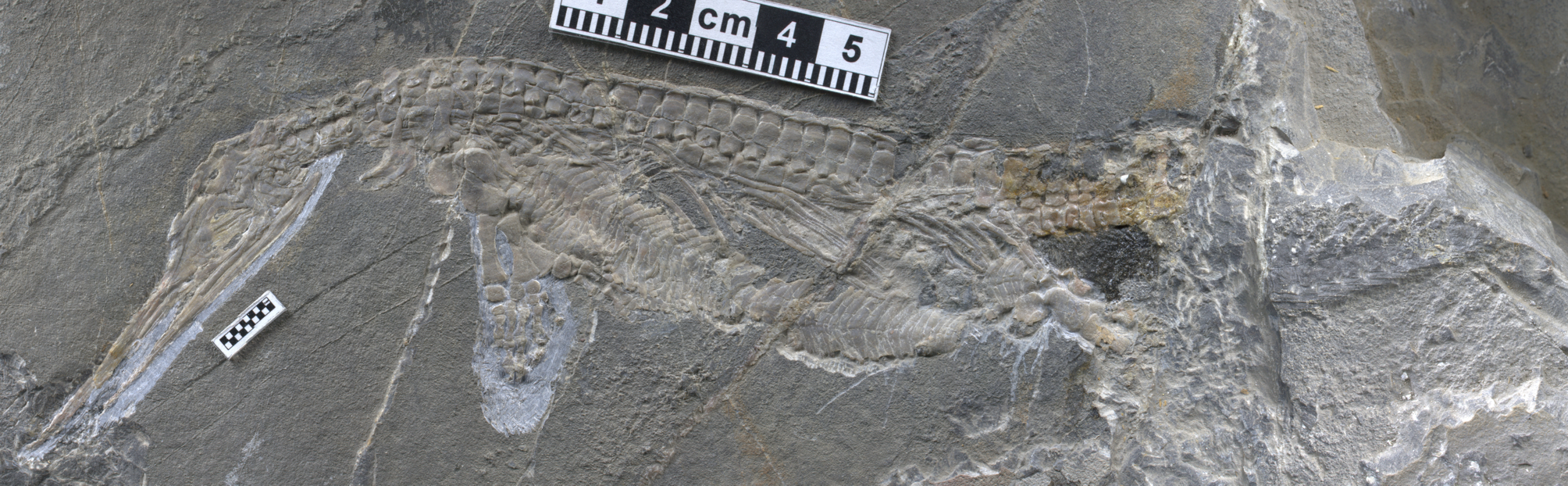
Eohupehsuchus holotype

Hupehsuchians were clearly well adapted to marine life, as they possessed limbs that were paddle-like in shape and had fusiform bodies. The characteristically elongated neural spines likely were associated with well-developed epaxial muscles (muscles lying above the transverse process of the vertebrae) that facilitated lateral undulation in an axial subundulatory mode. The pattern of articulation in the vertebrae suggests that such undulation was concentrated posteriorly near the pelvic girdle and tail. Hupehsuchus likely was better equipped for lateral undulation as a means of locomotion than Nanchangosaurus was, as evidenced by the assumed greater degree of lateral compression in the body of the former genus, as well as generally more elongated neural spines.

The presence of polydactyly in SSTM 5025 may have been an adaptation to moving across underwater substrates in a similar manner to some early tetrapods of the Devonian such as Acanthostega.

The flat, toothless rostrum may have supported an avian-like bill, or perhaps rows of baleen as seen in cetaceans of the suborder Mysticeti. The hupehsuchians seemingly were adapted to continuous ram feeding, a form of mobile suspension feeding. The large skull and lack of a fixed symphysis with the lower jaw is indicative of such a feeding method, but the narrowness of the rostrum and the existence of marine vertebrates with larger skulls that were not completely edentulous (e. g. ichthyosaurs) seem to point against it. The long necks of hupehsuchians would seem to inhibit continuous ram feeding at high speeds through the water, so more likely they practiced intermittent ram feeding at slower speeds.

The purpose of the dorsal dermal plates of hupehsuchians is unknown. These plates, as well as the ventral gastralia and the tendency for pachyostosis, would have added considerable weight to hupehsuchians, allowing them to have neutral buoyancy. However, the position of the dorsal plates are high above the center of gravity, and this seemingly would have made the bodies of hupehsuchians unstable. Hupehsuchians were among the largest marine animals of their time, so dorsal plates as a protective measure would be unneeded. The tendency for the dorsal plates to be more developed anteriorly may have allowed the anterior portion of the vertebral column to remain relatively rigid, while the posterior portion could freely undulate.

Whether hupehsuchians acquired plates subsequent to an adaptation to the marine environment is unclear, or inherited them from a terrestrial ancestor, in which case they would have given rigidity to the spine and protection from predators. In any case, if Nanchangosaurus is seen as representative of an ancestral morphological pattern that led to the more derived Hupehsuchus, then the plates seem to have experienced further development in hupehsuchians and must have had some advantage.

The general shape of hupehsuchians seems to have made any locomotion on land nearly impossible, and although no direct evidence is seen in known specimens, these animals were probably viviparous, giving live birth at sea rather than laying eggs on land. Vivipary is also seen in ichthyosaurs.
