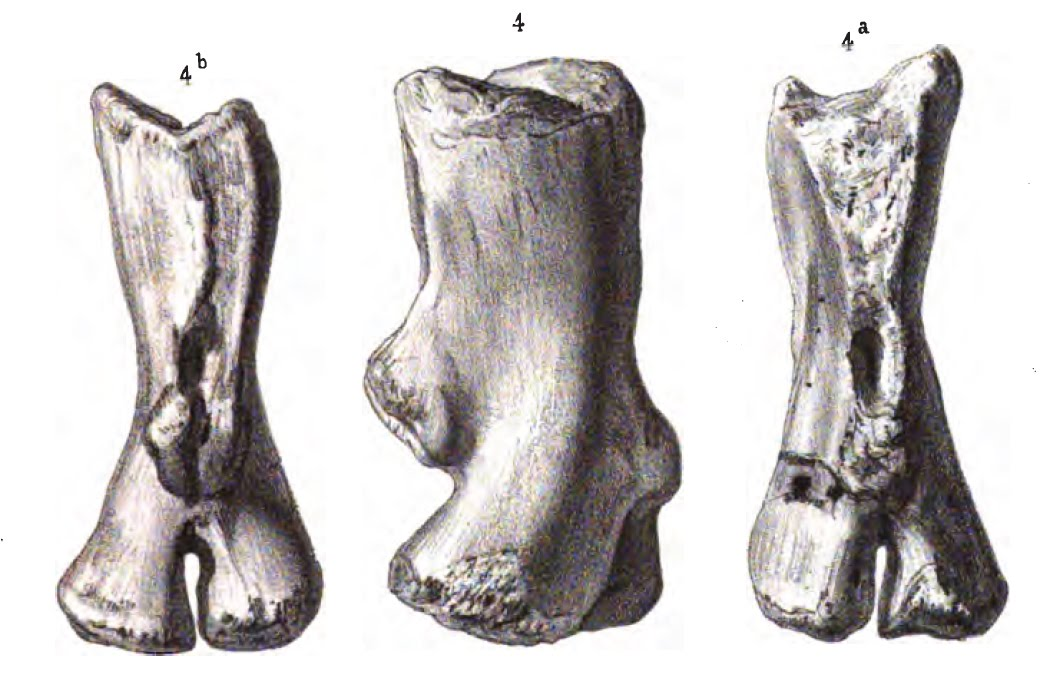
- Rachitrema pellati type neural arch in posterior (4b), right lateral (4) and anterior (4a) views. After Sauvage (1883)

Scientific classification
- Domain: Eukaryota
- Kingdom: Animalia
- Phylum: Chordata
- Class: Reptilia
- Order: †Ichthyosauria
- Genus: †Rachitrema; Sauvage, 1883

Type species
- †Rachitrema pellati Sauvage, 1883

= Rachitrema =

Rachitrema Temporal range: Late Triassic, Rhaetian

Extinct genus of reptiles

Rachitrema is a poorly known genus of ichthyosaur from the Triassic of France. Its remains were found in France by two independent collectors, towards the end of the nineteenth century. They were only isolated bone fragments.

== Classification ==
The type species is R. pellati, described by Sauvage in 1883. When first described, Sauvage classified it as a dinosaur. Later, Franz Nopcsa referred the genus to Anchisauridae, while Karl Alfred von Zittel referred it to either Zanclodontidae or Megalosauridae.

The ichthyosaur nature of Rachitrema was recognized by Friedrich von Huene, who synonymized it with Shastasaurus. Sauvage conceded that Rachitrema was non-dinosaurian, and the ichthyosaur classification of the genus became universally accepted by several authors. McGowan and Motani (2003) considered Rachitrema dinosaurian without comment. However, recent re-examination of the type material of Rachitrema reaffirms the ichthyosaurian classification of the genus, with most of the original remains referable to Ichthyosauria, and the rest being indeterminate beyond Reptilia.
