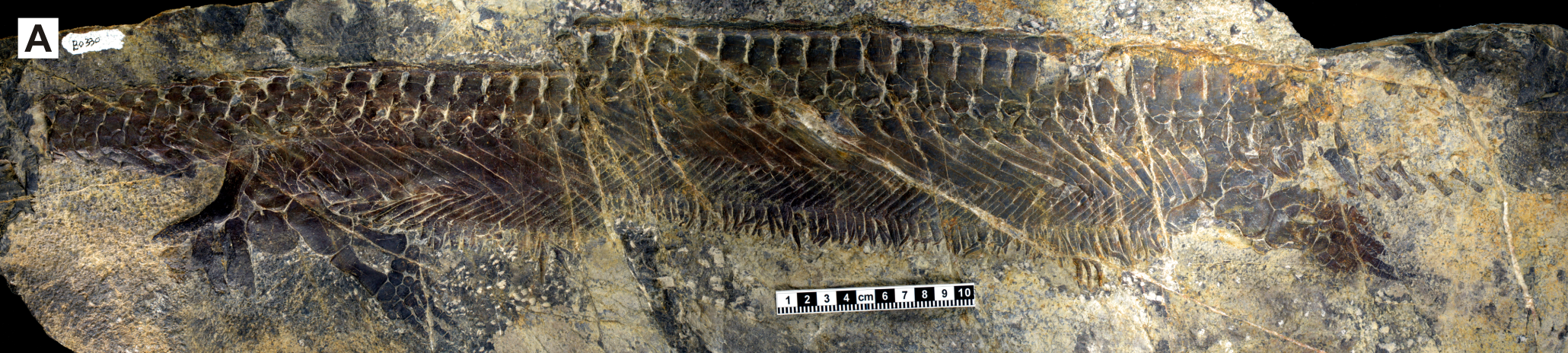
- Holotype specimen of Parahupehsuchus

Scientific classification
- Kingdom: Animalia
- Phylum: Chordata
- Class: Reptilia
- Order: †Hupehsuchia
- Family: †Hupehsuchidae
- Genus: †Parahupehsuchus; Chen et al., 2014

Type species
- †Parahupehsuchus longus Chen et al., 2014

= Parahupehsuchus =

Parahupehsuchus Temporal range: Early Triassic, Olenekian

Extinct genus of reptiles

Parahupehsuchus is an extinct genus of hupehsuchian marine reptiles from the Early Triassic of China. The genus is monotypic, known from the single species Parahupehsuchus longus and based on a single specimen. Like other hupehsuchians, it had an elongated torso, a tail nearly as long as the rest of the body, short and paddle-like limbs, extra bones in the fore- and hind limbs, thick ribs and gastralia, neural spines of the vertebrae split into two parts, and bony plates over the neural spines. It differs from other hupehsuchians in having an even more elongated body and wider ribs that touch along their edges and have no spaces between them. The ribs connect with gastralia on the underside of the torso to form a bony "tube" around the body wall.

== Description ==
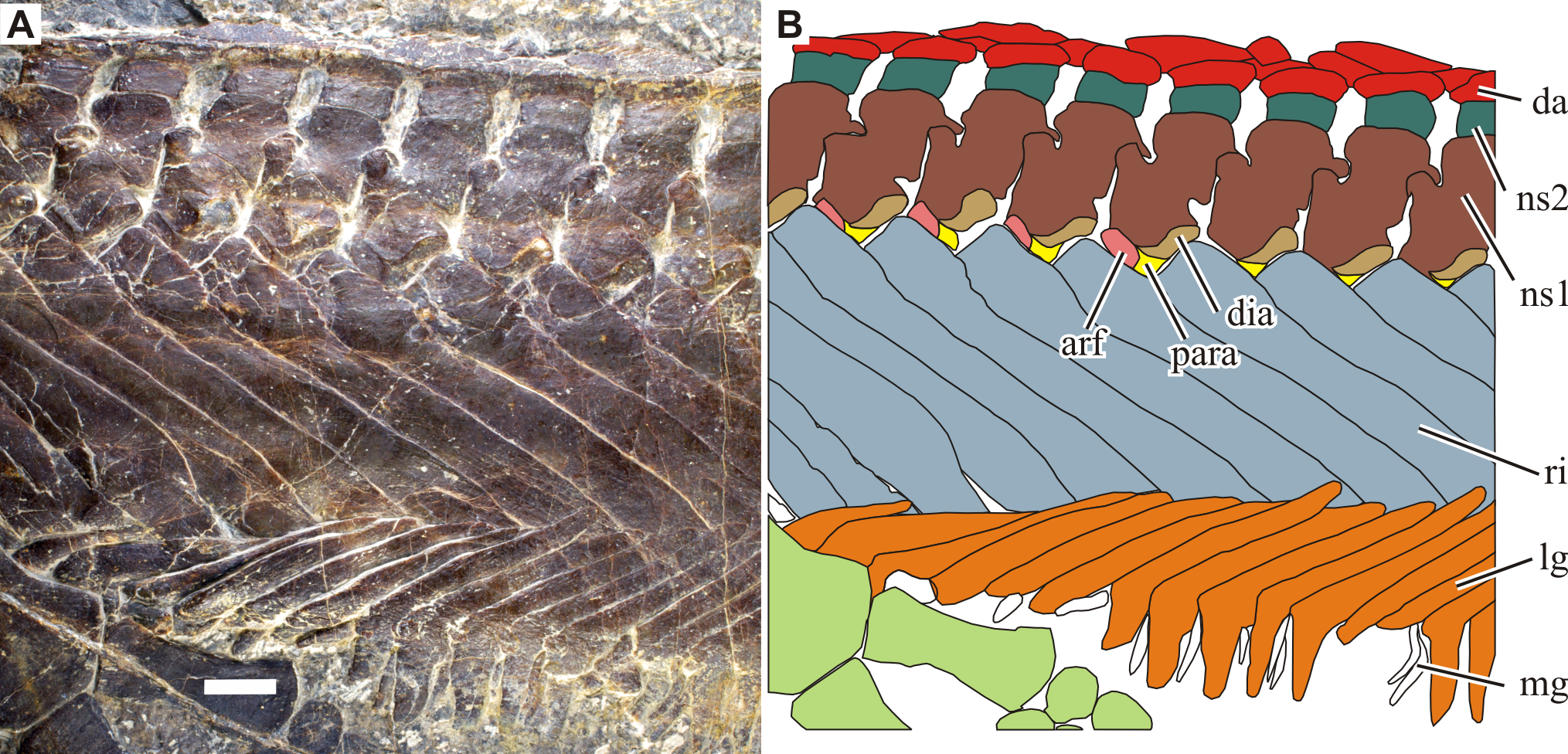
Diagram showing the armor and torso

Parahupehsuchus longus is known from a single type specimen, WGSC 26005, measuring 2 m (6.6 ft) in length. It was found in 2011 from an outcrop of the Early Triassic (Olenekian) Jialingjiang Formation in Yuan'an County, Hubei Province, China. WGSC 26005 consists of a mostly complete left half of a skeleton lacking the skull and most of the tail. The torso of Parahupehsuchus is very elongated; it has 38 dorsal vertebrae, 10 more than in Hupehsuchus and the unnamed hupehsuchian IVPP V4070. The rib cage of Parahupehsuchus is narrow and tube-shaped, unlike the barrel-shaped rib cage of Hupehsuchus.

The ribs of Parahupehsuchus are unlike those of any other hupehsuchian. They are wide and flat, touching edge-to-edge to form a bony tube across the torso. Rows of gastralia on the underside of the torso form a bottom wall enclosing this tube. Each rib articulates with two dorsal vertebrae, wedged between the diapophysis and parapophysis of the vertebra in front of it and an anterior rib facet extending from the parapophysis of the vertebra behind it. Each rib sweeps backward from its connection with the vertebrae. The gastralia, which overlap the bottom ends of the ribs, sweep forward.

== Phylogeny ==
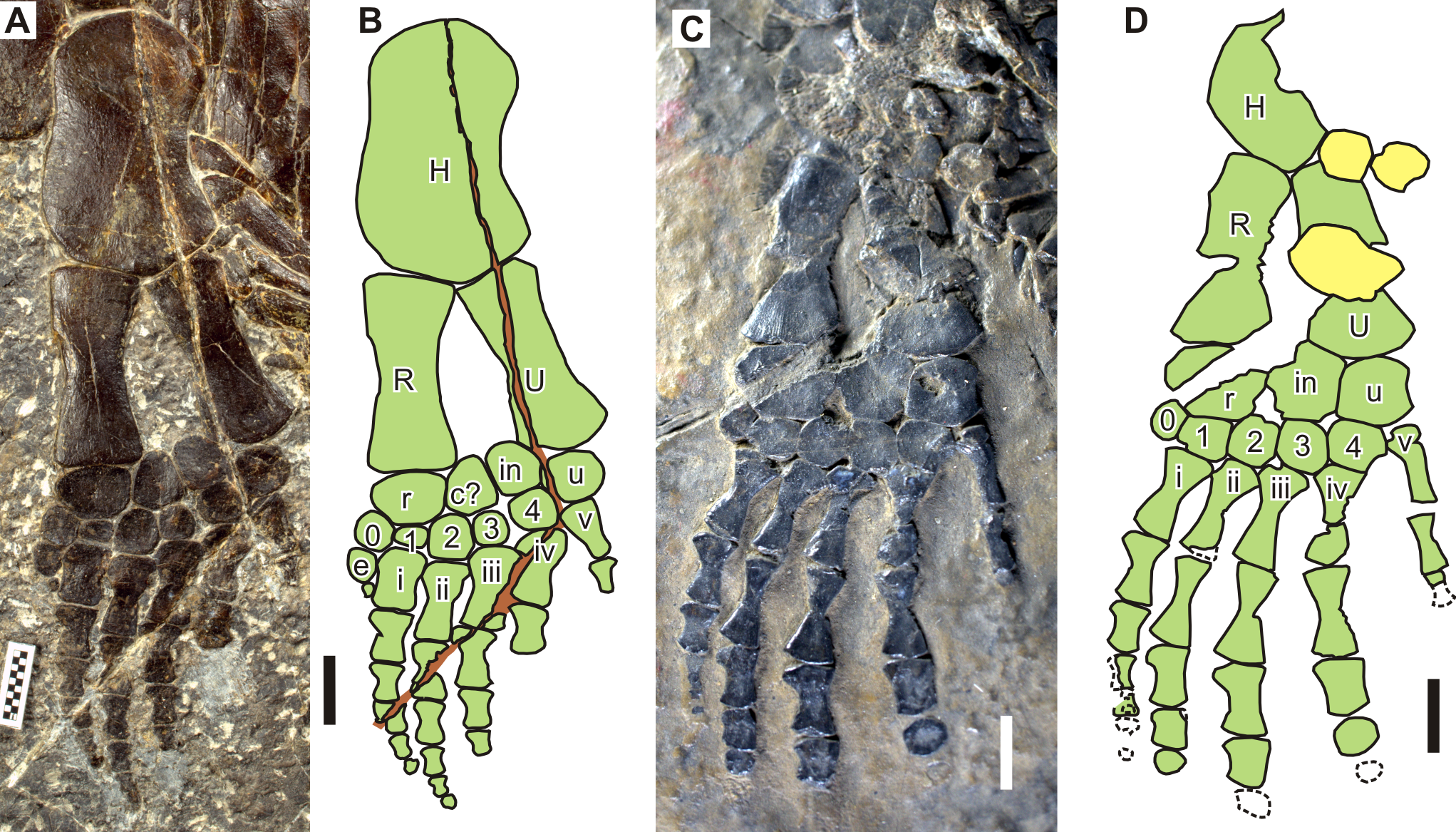
Forelimbs

- - Hovasaurus
  - - Utatsusaurus
    - Hupehsuchia
      - Nanchangosaurus
      - Hupehsuchidae
        - Hupehsuchus
        - - Parahupehsuchus
          - IVPP V4070
