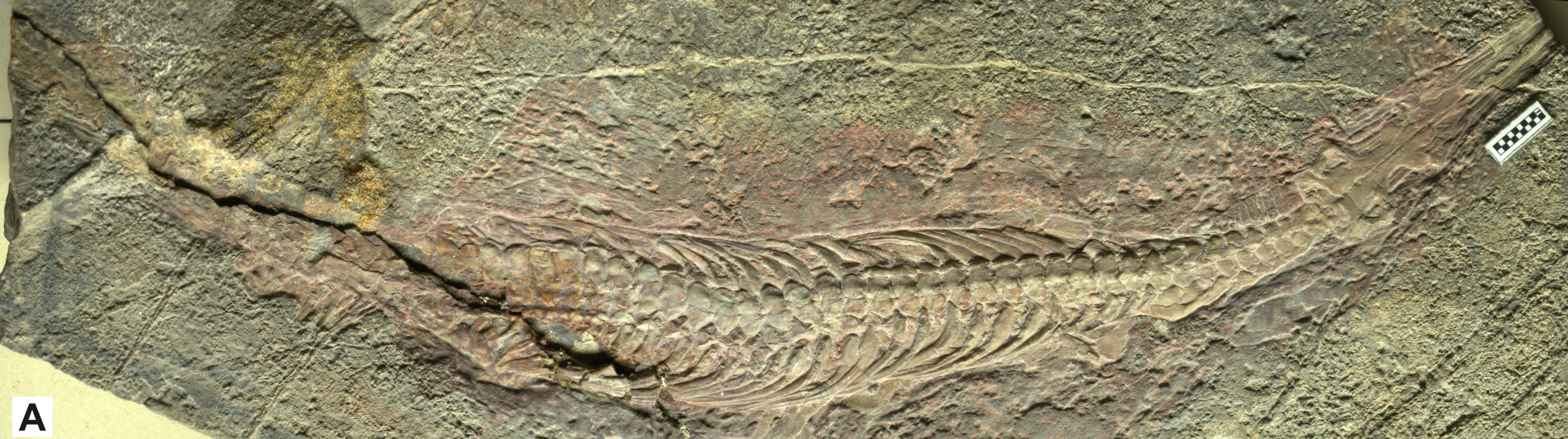
- Holotype specimen

Scientific classification
- Kingdom: Animalia
- Phylum: Chordata
- Class: Reptilia
- Order: †Hupehsuchia
- Family: †Nanchangosauridae
- Genus: †Nanchangosaurus; Wang, 1959

Type species
- †Nanchangosaurus suni Wang, 1959

= Nanchangosaurus =

Nanchangosaurus Temporal range: Middle Triassic, Anisian

Extinct genus of reptiles

Nanchangosaurus is an extinct genus of aquatic reptiles native to the middle Triassic of China. It was named after the area in China, Nanchang, where it was found. It was about more than 40 cm (16 in) in length, and probably fed on fish or used its long jaws to probe for aquatic invertebrates. It resembled the ichthyosaurs in build, and may be related to them.

== Description ==
Nanchangosaurus resembled a cross between an ichthyosaur and a crocodilian. It had a fusiform body, similar to a dolphin or an ichthyosaur, paddle-like limbs, with forelimbs being larger than hindlimbs, and a crocodilian-like tail for swimming through the water. It had bony scutes on its back, like an alligator, but had a long snout filled with teeth, like an ichthyosaur or a river dolphin.

== Classification ==
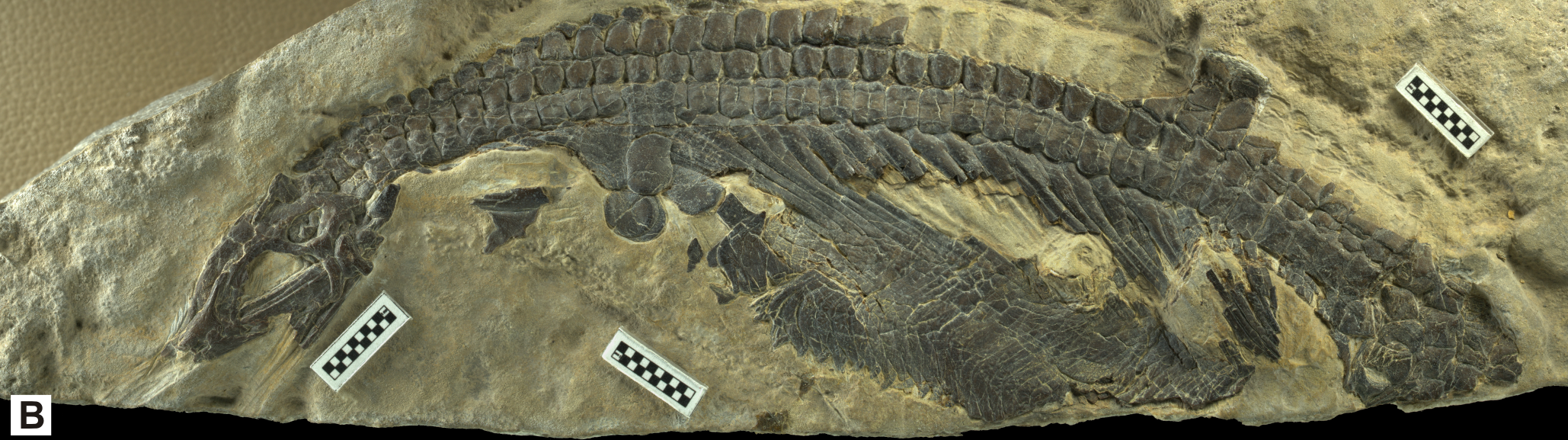
Assigned specimen

Nanchangosaurus is a member of the Hupehsuchia, a group that includes the very similar Hupehsuchus. In fact, the two may be congeneric. A few differences between the two species are seen. Hupehsuchus had heavier armor and more divided ridge spines than the two. Other than Hupehsuchus, little else is known about Nanchangosaurus relatives. They have sometimes been referred to as ancestors of the ichthyosaurs, because of their streamlined shape, long jaws, and paddle-like hands, as well as the discovery of polydactyly in the fins of Hupehsuchus, just like the ichthyosaurs. However, a gap in the skulls suggests that they may be related to archosaurs, instead. Some people even put them in the Eosuchia, a group of early diapsid reptiles.

== See also ==
- List of ichthyosaurs
- Timeline of ichthyosaur research
