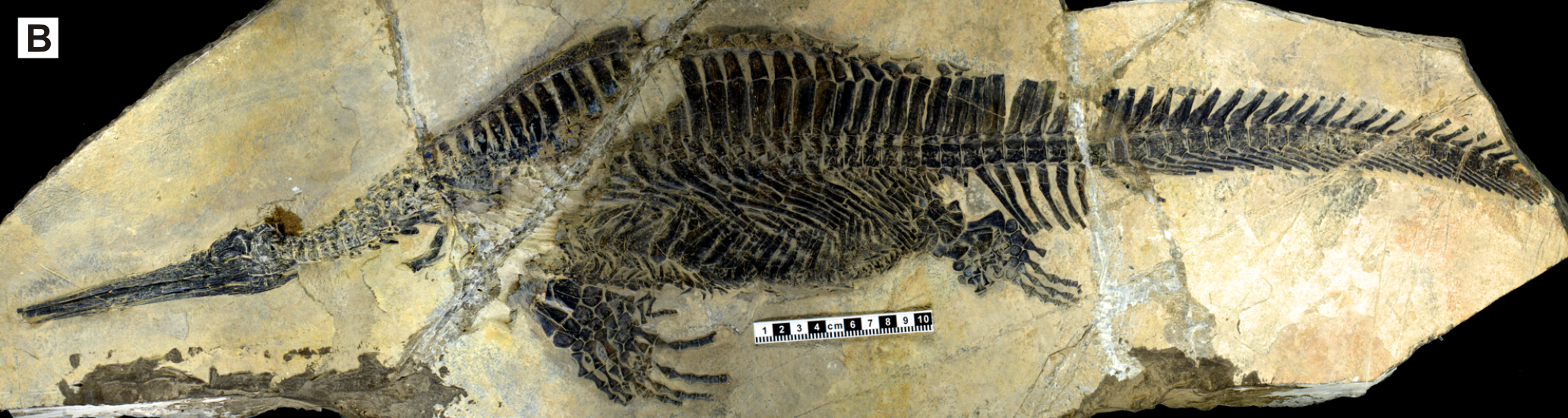
- Specimen WGSC 26004

Scientific classification
- Kingdom: Animalia
- Phylum: Chordata
- Class: Reptilia
- Order: †Hupehsuchia
- Family: †Hupehsuchidae
- Genus: †Hupehsuchus; Young, 1972

Type species
- †Hupehsuchus nanchangensis Young, 1972

= Hupehsuchus =

Hupehsuchus Temporal range: Early Triassic, Olenekian, Olenekian

Extinct genus of reptiles

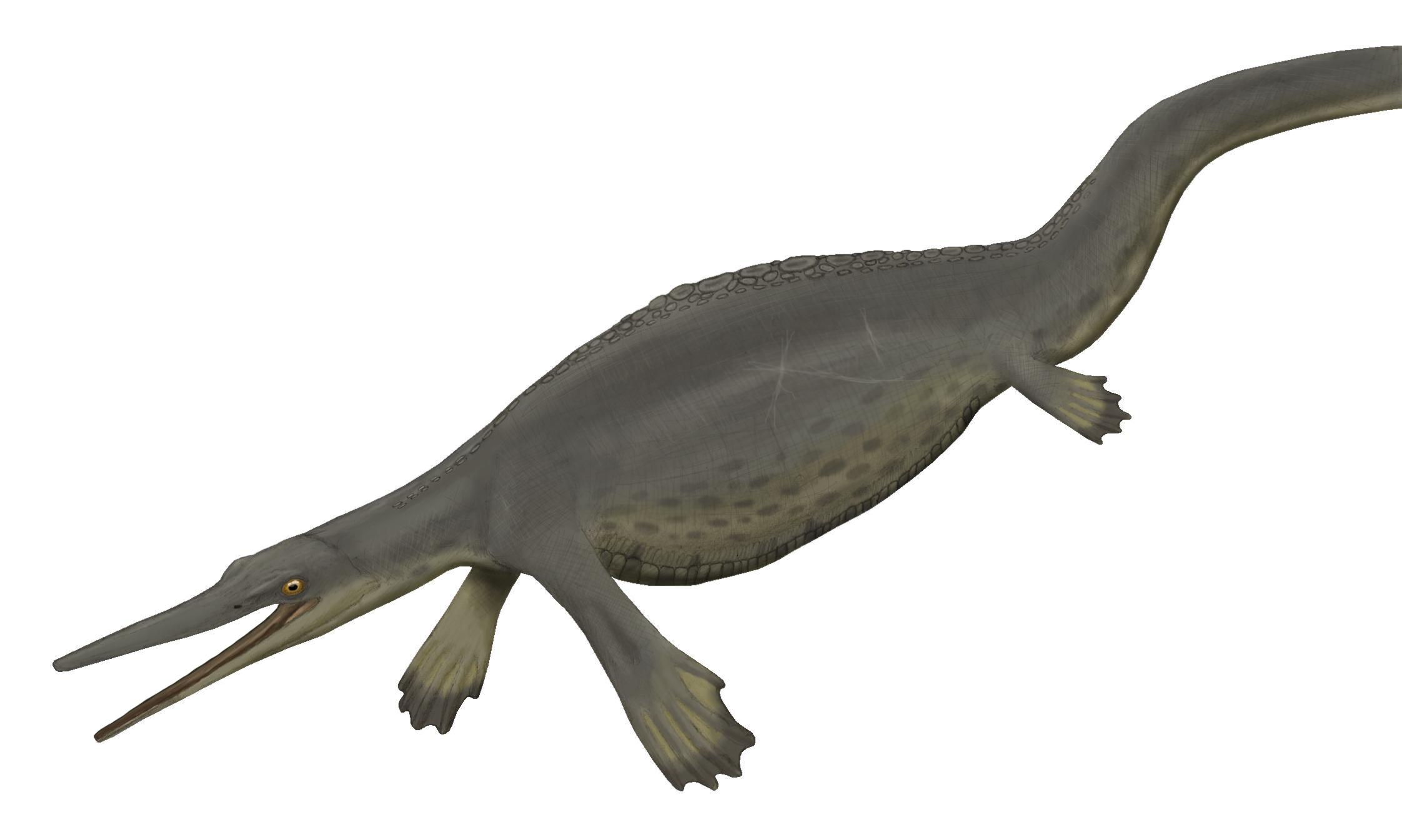
Life restoration of Hupehsuchus nanchangensis

Hupehsuchus is an extinct genus of small marine reptiles, about 1 m (3 ft) long, found in the area of Hubei in China. This marine reptile lived in the Olenekian stage of the Early Triassic period.

== Description ==
Skeletal mount, National Natural History Museum of China

Hupehsuchus was similar to its close relative, Nanchangosaurus, but differed from it in a number of ways. For example, Hupehsuchus had heavier armor on its back than Nanchangosaurus, and its back spines were more finely divided, giving it a more crocodile-like appearance than Nanchangosaurus. It had a thin, long snout like a gharial, river dolphin, or ichthyosaur, which it probably used to snag fish or probe for aquatic invertebrates. A 2023 study by Zi-Chen Fang and coauthors suggests, based on cranial anatomy paralleling that of baleen whales, that Hupehsuchus could have been a filter feeder. However, this was contested by a 2025 study by Ryosuke Motani and coauthors, who found its skull anatomy dissimilar to baleen whales and anatomically unsuitable for filter feeding, instead noting similarities to pelicans, and arguing that a pelican-like feeding style was more probable.

== Classification ==
Exactly to what species Hupehsuchus is related is unknown. Fairly clearly, it shares a close relationship with Nanchangosaurus, but other relations are unknown. Many features, including the discovery of polydactyly, suggest that Hupehsuchus is related to the ichthyosaurs, but the fact that Hupehsuchus' extra digits include more bones in the hand, rather than just the fingers as in the ichthyosaurs, may discredit that theory. It, along with Nanchangosaurus, seems to be so different from any other reptile that a new order has been constructed for the two genera called Hupehsuchia.
