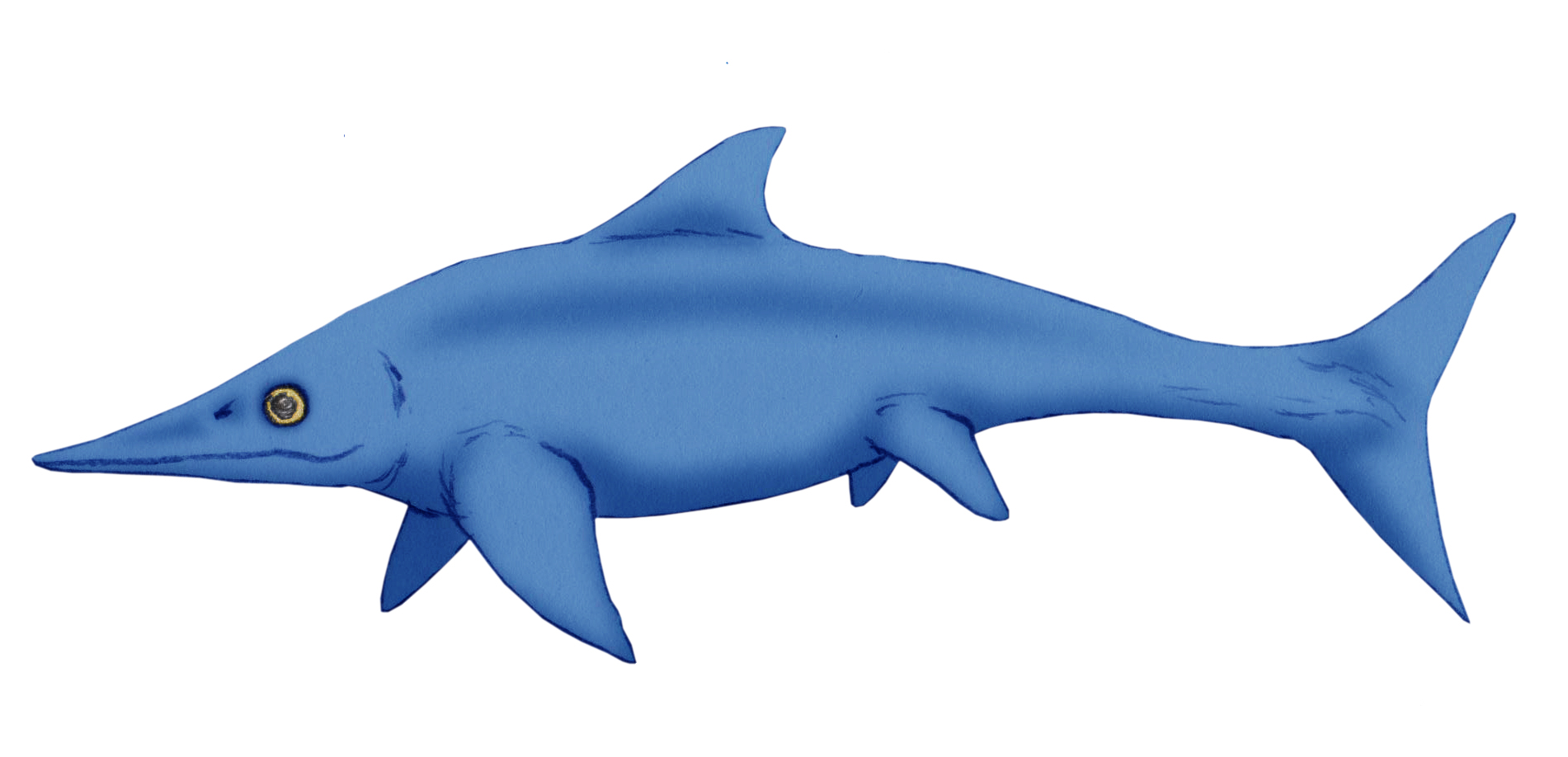
- Life restoration

Scientific classification
- Kingdom: Animalia
- Phylum: Chordata
- Class: Reptilia
- Order: †Ichthyosauria
- Family: †Ichthyosauridae
- Genus: †Malawania; Fischer et al., 2013

Type species
- †Malawania anachronus Fischer et al., 2013

= Malawania =

Malawania Temporal range: Early Cretaceous (Hauterivian or Barremian), ~132–125 Ma

Extinct genus of reptiles

Malawania is an extinct genus of basal thunnosaurian ichthyosaur that lived during the Hauterivian or Barremian stages of the Early Cretaceous in what is now Iraq. The type and only known species is M. anachronus, first described in 2013 on the basis of a partial skeleton discovered at Amadia in 1952. The geological age of the specimen remained uncertain for several decades until palynological analyses demonstrated that it dated to the Early Cretaceous, making Malawania the first known non-ophthalmosaurid ichthyosaur to have survived beyond the Jurassic–Cretaceous boundary. Its scientific name, meaning "out-of-time swimmer", refers to the taxon's seemingly anachronistic nature, as its primitive anatomy contrasts markedly with its Early Cretaceous age. Morphologically, Malawania closely resembles the emblematic Early Jurassic ichthyosaur Ichthyosaurus, with most phylogenetic analyses recovering the two genera as sister taxa within Ichthyosauridae. This close relationship, despite a temporal gap of approximately 66 million years, challenges the hypothesis of a complete turnover of ichthyosaur faunas across the Jurassic–Cretaceous boundary and instead suggests that some lineages retained a relatively conservative body plan over a remarkably long interval of their evolutionary history.

== Discovery and naming ==
The holotype and only currently known specimen of Malawania was discovered in 1952 at Chia Gara, Amadia in Iraqi Kurdistan, by a team of British petroleum geologists led by Douglas M. Morton. It consists of a partial articulated skeleton comprising a fragmentary skull, several cervical and dorsal vertebrae, ribs, part of the shoulder girdle, and an almost complete left flipper. The fossil was not recovered in situ, but was instead found lying beside a wadi, where it may have been placed for use as a paving slab along a mule track. Recognising its scientific importance, Morton's team transported the specimen to the United Kingdom and donated it to the Natural History Museum, London, in 1959, where it has since been catalogued as NHMUK PV R6682. The specimen was first examined in 1974 by the British palaeontologist Robert M. Appleby, who at the time was the only researcher in Britain working on ichthyosaurs.

In 1979, Appleby submitted a manuscript describing the fossil to the scientific journal Palaeontology, but it was rejected after one of the reviewers considered the information regarding its stratigraphic provenance to be inadequate. Although Appleby noted the specimen's close anatomical resemblance to the iconic Early Jurassic ichthyosaur Ichthyosaurus, he was unable to determine its geological age with certainty. Because the fossil was preserved on an isolated slab that did not correspond to the surrounding bedrock, it lacked a reliable stratigraphic context. On the basis of several anatomical features, Appleby even considered the possibility that it was of Late Triassic age. This interpretation was, however, disputed by geologists who had worked in the Chia Gara region, who instead regarded the specimen as originating from the Jurassic Sargelu Formation, although they were unable to determine whether it came from the Middle or Late Jurassic. The first palynological analysis of the rock matrix, carried out in 1980 by the Canadian palaeobotanist Norman F. Hughes, indicated an Early Cretaceous age, probably predating the Aptian. However, Appleby nevertheless regarded these results as most likely erroneous.

Despite continuing his investigations over the following years in an attempt to establish the age of the specimen—which he intended to name Iraqisaurus kurdistanensis—Appleby's work on other ichthyosaurs delayed publication of the study, which remained unfinished at the time of his death in 2004. The recovery of Appleby's unpublished manuscripts by the Scottish palaeontologist Jeff Liston prompted a renewed investigation into the fossil's stratigraphic provenance. By collecting new samples directly from the rock matrix enclosing the specimen, Liston recovered microfossils consisting of dinoflagellate cysts, pollen grains, and spores. The results confirmed Hughes' original interpretation: the occurrence of the dinoflagellate cyst Muderongia staurota, together with two pollen taxa and three spore taxa, indicates an age ranging from the late Hauterivian to the Barremian of the Early Cretaceous. This age suggests that the Iraqi specimen originated from the lower part of either the Sarmord Formation or the Balambo Formation, both of which crop out close to the locality where it was discovered.

In a study published in 2013 and led by the Belgian palaeontologist Valentin Fischer, the specimen was designated as the holotype of the new genus and species Malawania anachronus. The genus name Malawania is derived from the Kurdish word malawan, meaning "swimmer", whereas the specific name anachronus, from Latinised Greek, means "out of time". The latter refers to the taxon's "anachronistic" nature, as its primitive anatomy contrasts markedly with its Early Cretaceous age. Malawania also represents the second ichthyosaur reported from the Middle East, following a possible Triassic mixosaurid discovered in Saudi Arabia, and the first post-Triassic ichthyosaur known from the region.

== Description ==
Malawania was a small ichthyosaur, with an estimated body length of 3 metres (9.8 ft). Although incompletely known, it would, like other ichthyosaurs, have possessed a long, slender snout, large eye sockets, and a tail fluke that was supported by vertebrae in the lower half. Ichthyosaurs were superficially similar to dolphins and had flippers rather than legs, and most (except for early species) had dorsal fins. Although the colour of Malawania is unknown, at least some ichthyosaurs may have been uniformly dark-coloured in life, which is evidenced by the discovery of high concentrations of eumelanin pigments in the preserved skin of an early ichthyosaur fossil.

=== Skeletal anatomy ===
Each lacrimal (paired bones at the front edges of the orbits) bears a hollow towards its front edge. Fischer and colleagues speculated that these may have been the location of the lacrimal glands (which produce the tear film). The long, backwards projecting processes of the lacrimals extend halfway underneath the orbits (eye sockets). The eyeballs were supported by rings of 13 bones, known as scleral rings.

Malawania has a minimum of five neck vertebrae. While the boundary between them is still demarcated, the first two vertebrae are fused. All of the known centra (vertebral bodies) are the same length, save for the first, which has a length double that of the rest. In some of the trunk vertebrae, the forwards-placed facets for the ribs flow smoothly together with the edges of the vertebrae. The well-spaced neural spines towards the front of the animal have trapezoidal tops, a unique feature of this genus. The cross sections of the ribs are bilobed.

Unlike baracromians, the scapulae (shoulder blades) of Malawania have unemarginated front surfaces. The trapezoid-shaped humeri (upper arm bones) are unusually short, a morphology unique to this genus. The upper end of each humerus bears a backwards-pointing projection known as a capitular process. This trait is also unique to Malawania, with the processes of other ichthyosaurs being semicircular. The humeri do not narrow at their middle, an atypical trait outside of Ophthalmosauridae. The lower ends of the humeri do not broaden significantly, each articulating with two bones, the radius and ulna. These two six-sided bones are elongate and contact each other across the entirety of their inner margins, without an opening between them.

With the exception of the quadrangular radiales (carpals below the radii), most of the hand bones of Malawania are hexagon-shaped and tightly interlocked, similar to Macgowania. The intermedia (a pair of wrist bones) approach the size of the radii, distinctive of Malawania. Two digits originate from each intermedium, similar to Ichthyosaurus. There are two other digits in the foreflippers of Malawania for a total of four. The first digit would have had more than nine phalanges (digit bones) when complete, the first of these bearing a notch.

== Classification ==
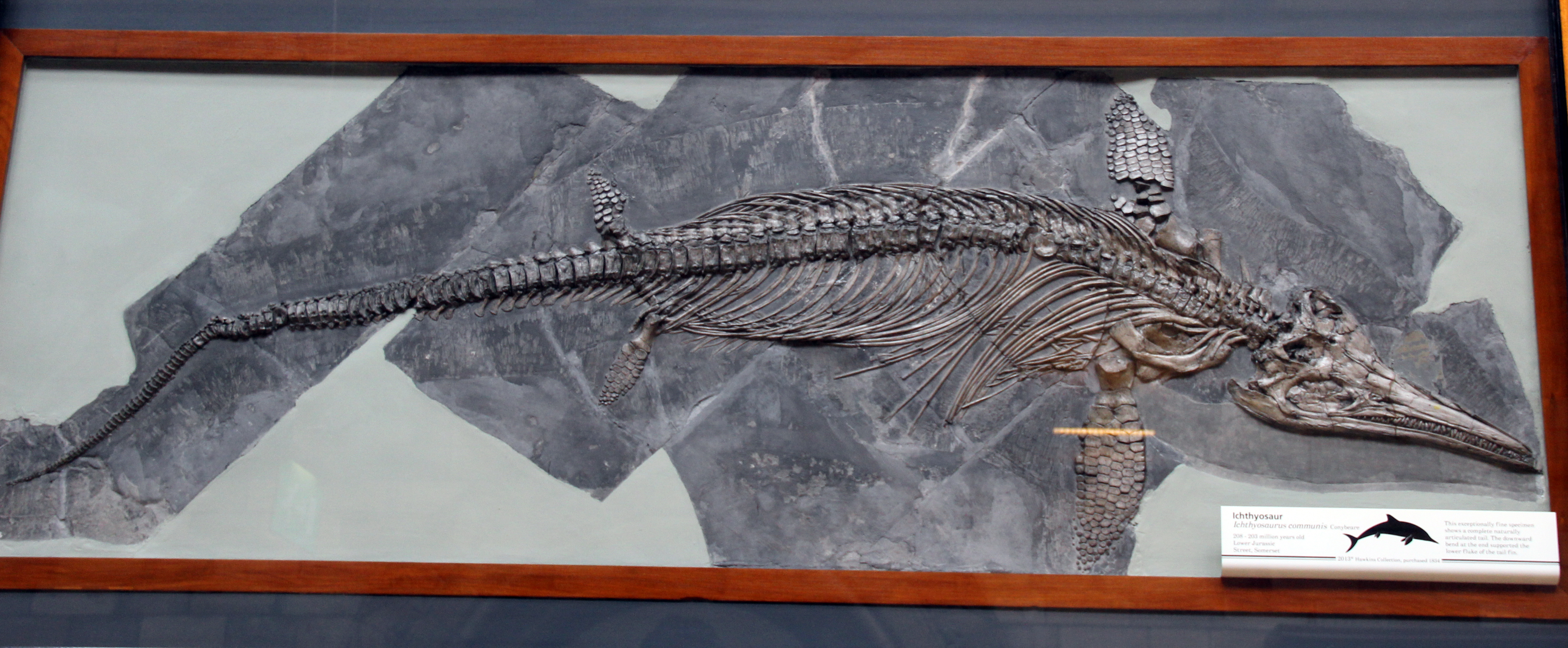
Fossil skeleton of Ichthyosaurus somersetensis, a closely related taxon related to Malawania.

In their 2013 study, Fischer and colleagues classified M. anachronus as a basal member of Thunnosauria on the basis of several anatomical features, including the presence of bicapitate (double-headed) dorsal ribs and the absence of a prominent anterior tuberosity on the anterodistal end of the humerus. Their main phylogenetic analysis recovered it as the sister taxon of Ichthyosaurus communis, leading the authors to assign both taxa to the family Ichthyosauridae. All more derived thunnosaurians, including Stenopterygius and the Ophthalmosauridae, were grouped within a new clade, Baracromia. As ichthyosaurids had previously been regarded as having become extinct during the Early Jurassic, approximately 66 million years before the estimated age of Malawania, the latter became the first recognised non-ophthalmosaurid ichthyosaur to have survived beyond the Jurassic–Cretaceous boundary. This discovery challenged the hypothesis of a complete turnover of ichthyosaur faunas across that boundary and instead suggested that the group exhibited greater morphological stability than had previously been assumed.

Nevertheless, the phylogenetic position of Malawania has been reassessed repeatedly in subsequent studies. While several phylogenetic analyses have continued to recover it as the sister taxon of Ichthyosaurus, a study published in 2017 by the British palaeontologist Dean R. Lomax and colleagues instead recovered Malawania as a basal thunnosaur, with Ichthyosaurus forming the sister taxon of Protoichthyosaurus. More recent analyses have in turn recovered a variety of alternative positions, placing Malawania either as close to Hauffiopteryx, among basal parvipelvians, among derived baracromians, or even outside Parvipelvia altogether. In 2025, when describing the leptonectid Xiphodracon, Lomax and colleagues once again recovered Malawania within the Ichthyosauridae, this time as part of a clade comprising all currently recognised members of the family. A simplified version of their cladogram is shown below:

- Neoichthyosauria
  - Temnodontosauridae
  - - Temnodontosaurus azerguensis
    - - Temnodontosaurus crassimanus
      - - Ichthyosauridae
          - Malawania anachronus
          - - Ichthyosaurus conybeari
            - - - Ichthyosaurus larkini
                - - Protoichthyosaurus prostaxalis
                  - Protoichthyosaurus applebyi
              - - Ichthyosaurus somersetensis
                - - Ichthyosaurus breviceps
                  - - Ichthyosaurus anningae
                    - Ichthyosaurus communis
        - - Leptonectidae
          - - Stenopterygius spp.
            - - Chacaicosaurus cayi
              - Ophthalmosauria

== See also ==
- List of ichthyosaurs
- Timeline of ichthyosaur research
- Geology of Iraq
