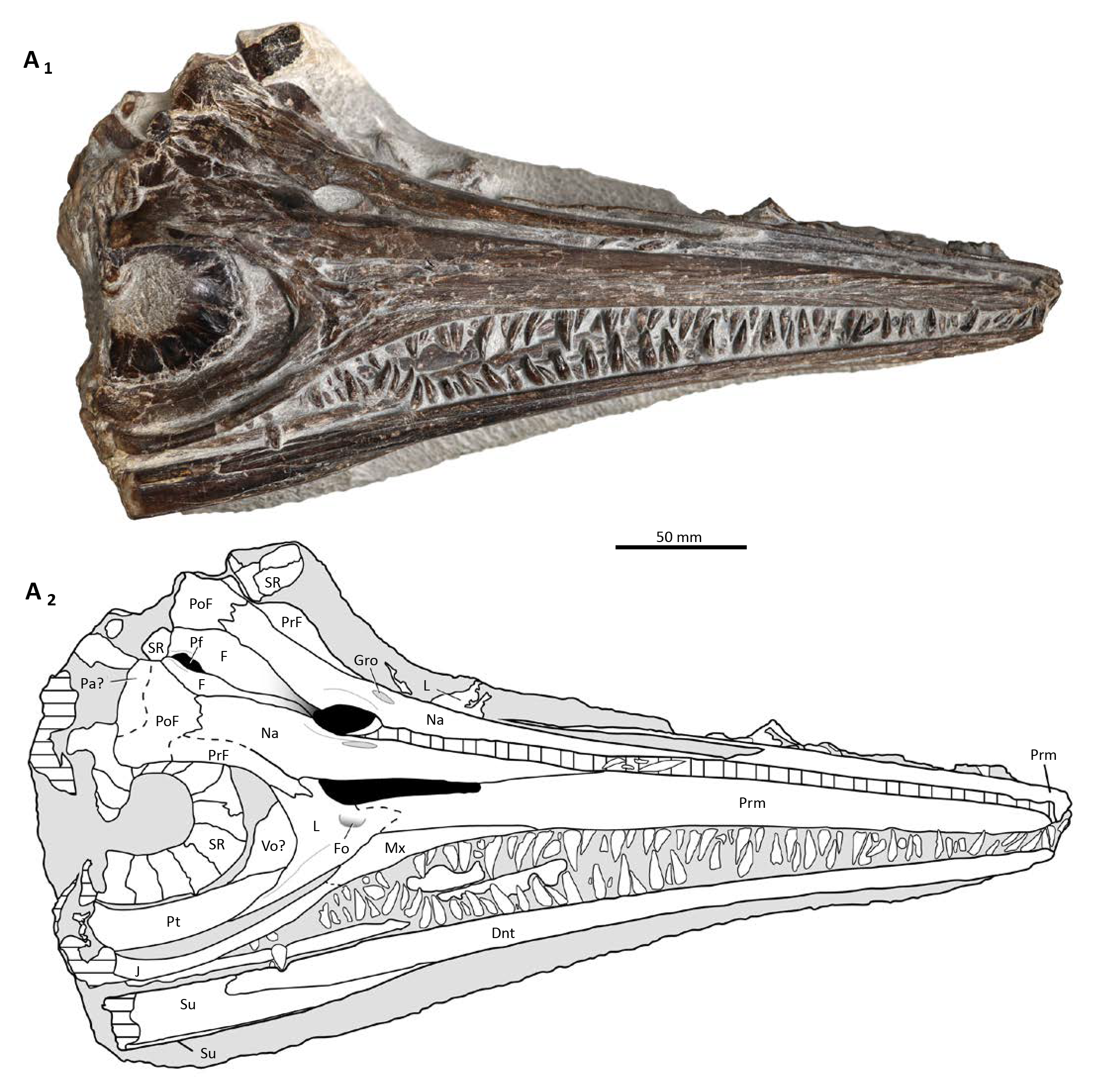
- Holotype skull

Scientific classification
- Kingdom: Animalia
- Phylum: Chordata
- Order: †Ichthyosauria
- Clade: †Baracromia
- Genus: †Gadusaurus; Pratas e Sousa et al., 2025
- Species: †G. aqualigneus

Binomial name
- †Gadusaurus aqualigneus Pratas e Sousa et al., 2025

= Gadusaurus =

Gadusaurus Temporal range: Early Jurassic, upper Sinemurian

Genus of ichthyosaurs

Gadusaurus (meaning "codfish lizard") is an extinct genus of baracromian ichthyosaurs from the Early Jurassic (Sinemurian age) Água de Madeiros Formation of Portugal. The genus contains a single species, G. aqualigneus, known from a nearly complete skull.

== Discovery and naming ==
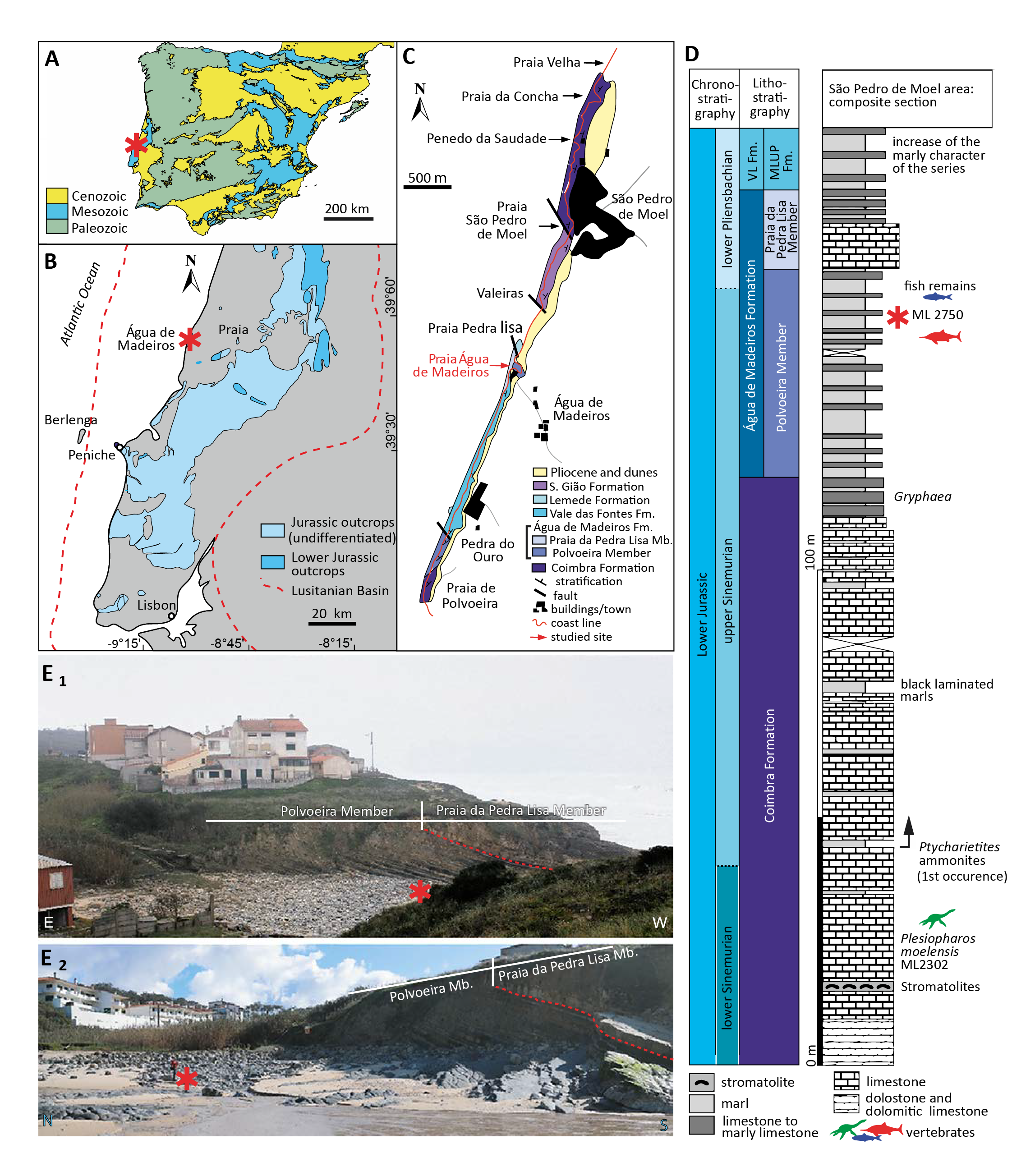
Type locality and geological setting of the holotype

The Gadusaurus holotype specimen, ML 2750, was discovered by Isabel M. Roldão on April 8, 2021, in outcrops of the Água de Madeiros Formation (upper Polvoeira Member) on the beach of São Pedro de Moel (Praia de Água de Madeiros) in Marinha Grande municipality, Portugal. The specimen consists of a nearly complete, but flattened, skull primarily visible in right lateral (side) view.

In 2025, Pratas e Sousa et al. described Gadusaurus aqualigneus as a new genus and species of ichthyosaurs based on these fossil remains. The generic name, Gadusaurus, combines the Latin word gadus, meaning "codfish", with the Ancient Greek σαῦρος (sauros), meaning "lizard"—this references both the animal's superficially fishlike body shape and the popularity of codfish in the country's cuisine. The specific name, aqualigneus, combines the Latin words aqua, meaning "water" and lignum, meaning "wood", referring to the type locality in Água de Madeiros (meaning "water of woods").

== Description ==
The holotype individual of Gadusaurus likely belonged to an animal around 2 metres (6.6 ft). As preserved, the cranium is 35.2 centimetres (13.9 in) long, although the bones posterior (behind) to the orbit are missing or disarticulated. Many of the cranial sutures visible on the holotype skull are fully fused or even unrecognizable, a feature often seen in fully-grown ichthyosaurs. However, the midline suture of the skull is not fused, which is indicative of sexual immaturity in these animals. This may imply the Gadusaurus holotype belongs to a juvenile or subadult individual, though the extent to which the skull underwent taphonomic deformation following burial—potentially distorting the suture structure—is unclear. Most of the teeth are present, with 88 teeth visible on the right side of the skull, including those on the premaxilla, maxilla, and dentary.

== Classification ==
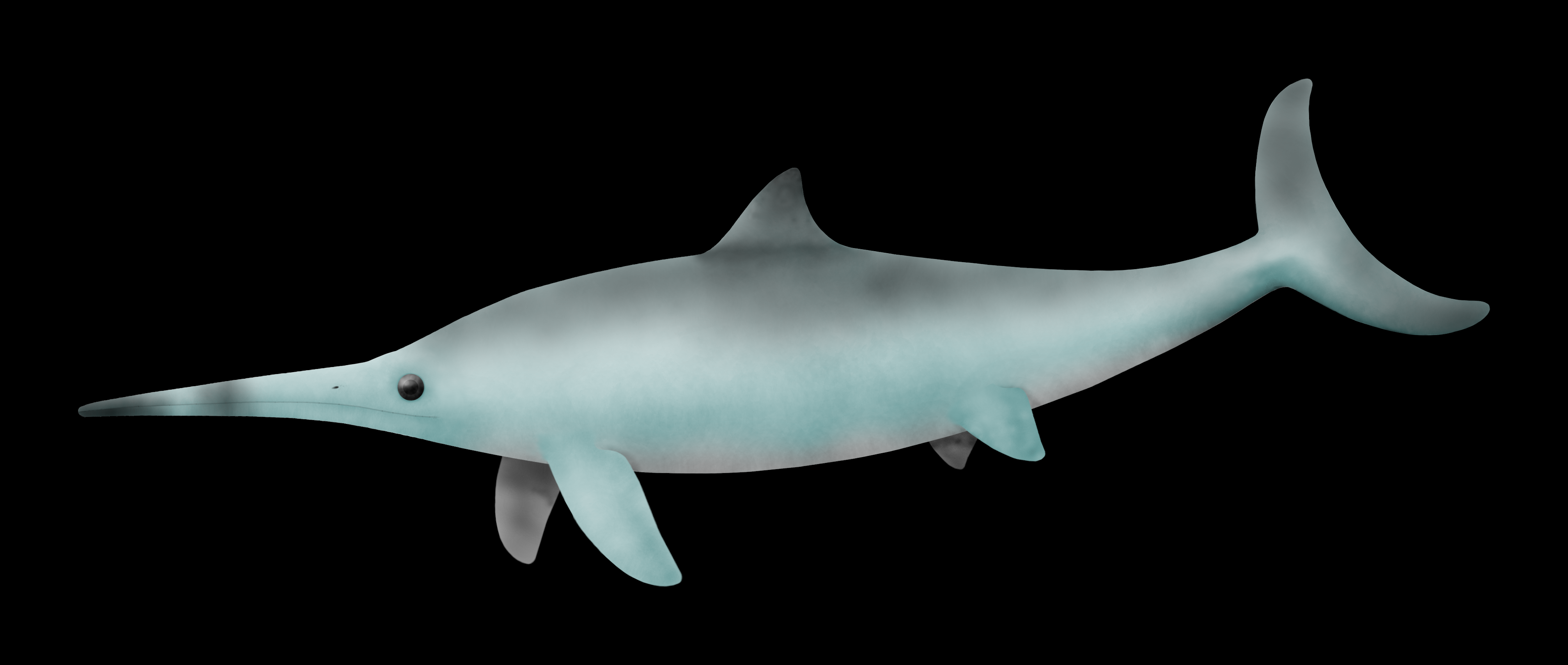
Speculative life restoration of Chacaicosaurus, a close relative of Gadusaurus

Using a modified version of the phylogenetic matrix of Maxwell & Cortés (2020), Pratas e Sousa et al. (2025) recovered Gadusaurus as the sister taxon to Chacaicosaurus within the parvipelvian ichthyosaur clade Baracromia. In turn this clade was found to be the sister to Ophthalmosauria. The results of their analysis using extended implied weighting are displayed in the cladogram below:

- Neoichthyosauria
  - Temnodontosaurus spp.
  - - Eurhinosauria
    - Thunnosauria
      - Ichthyosauridae
      - Baracromia
        - Stenopterygius spp.
        - - Hauffiopteryx spp.
          - - Malawania
            - - Stenopterygius aaleniensis
              - - - Gadusaurus
                  - Chacaicosaurus
                - - Ophthalmosauridae
