= Staffelegg Formation =

Formation of Early Jurassic age in the Canton of Aargau of northern Switzerland

- Stratigraphic range: late Hettangian-early Toarcian; ~200–182 Ma
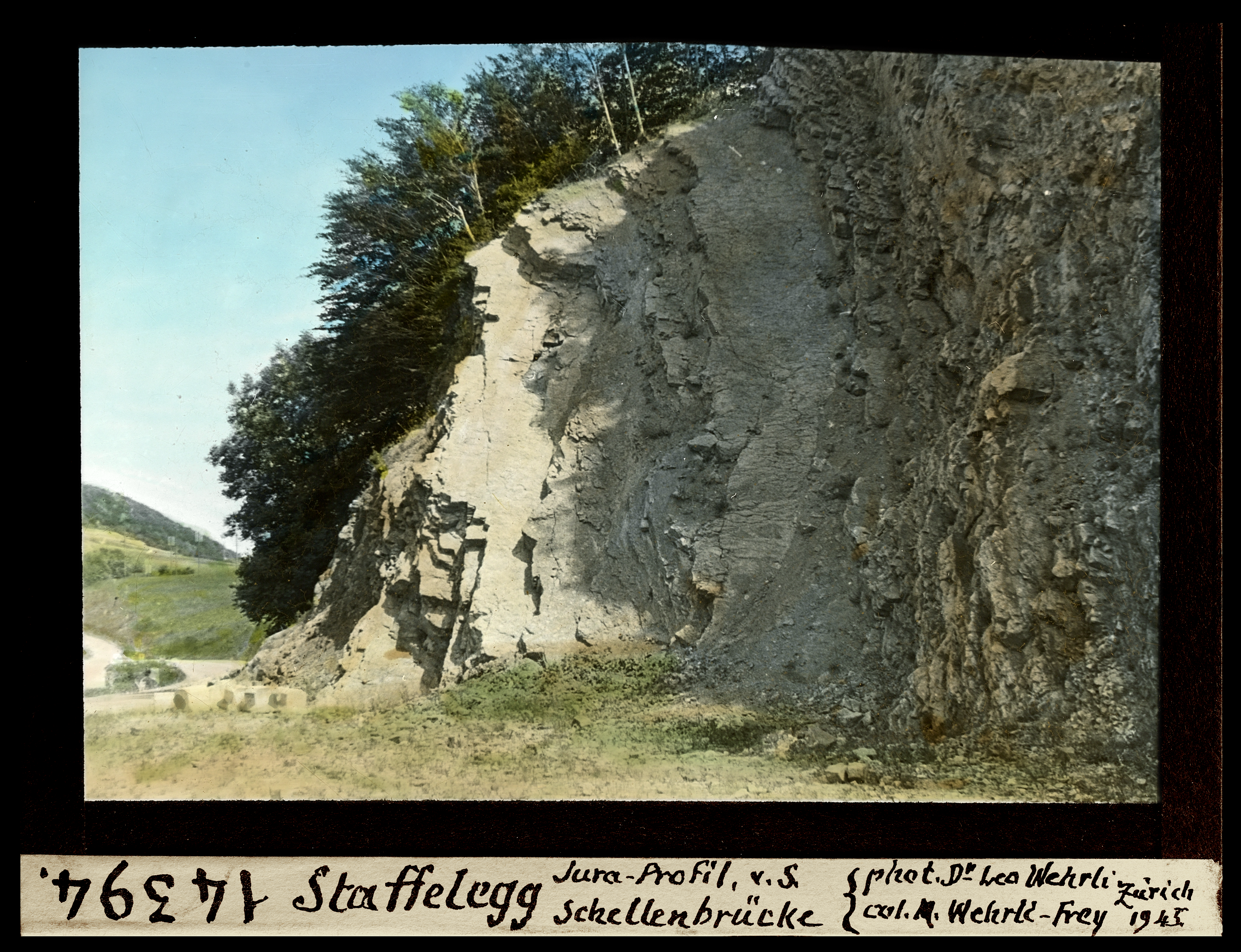
- Outcrop of the formation in the Schellen quarry
- Type: Geological formation
- Sub-units: See text
- Underlies: Opalinus Clay
- Overlies: Keuper Group
- Thickness: 20 to 50 m (66 to 164 ft)

Lithology
- Primary: Siltstone, marl
- Other: Limestone, sandstone

Location
- Coordinates: 47.4°N 8.6°E
- Approximate paleocoordinates: 36.9°N 17.4°E
- Region: Canton of Aargau
- Country: Switzerland
- Extent: Folded Jura

Type section
- Named for: Staffelegg Pass
- Named by: Reisdorf et al.
- Location: Staffelegg
- Year defined: 2011
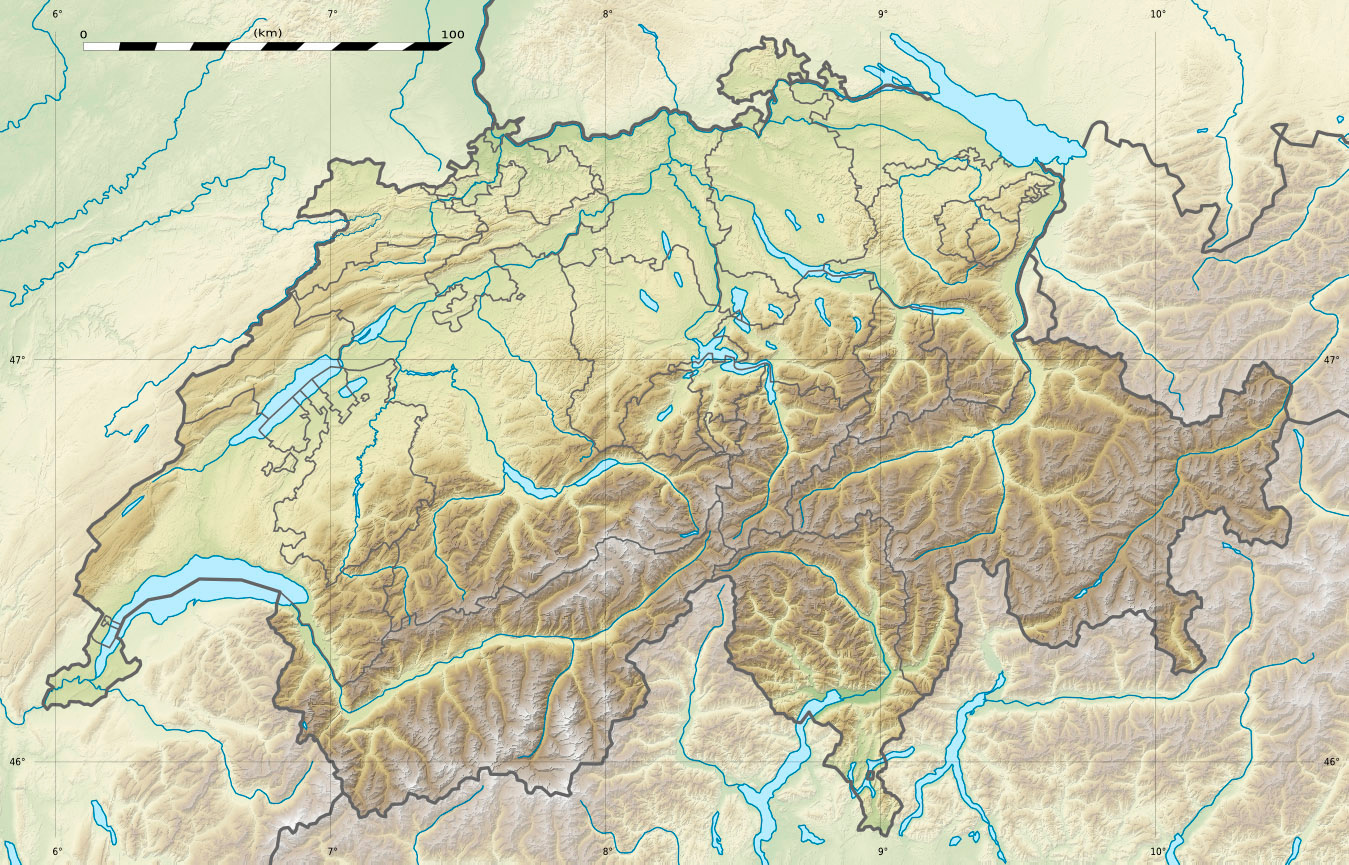
- Staffelegg Formation (Switzerland)

The Staffelegg Formation (German: Staffelegg-Formation, French: Formation de la Staffelegg, Italian: Formazione della Staffelegg) is a formation of Early Jurassic age (late Hettangian to early Toarcian stages) in the Canton of Aargau of northern Switzerland. The siltstones, marls, limestones and intermittent sandstones of the formation were deposited on the Northern Tethyan Carbonate Platform (NTCP). The Staffelegg Formation has provided fossils of the ichthyosaur Eurhinosaurus longirostris and the ammonite Catacoeloceras raquinianum.

== Description ==
The formation is found in the northern canton of Aargau of Switzerland and has a thickness of 20 to 50 metres (66 to 164 ft), and in the Mont Terri area approximately 70 metres (230 ft). The Staffelegg Formation is named after the Staffelegg Pass, overlies the Keuper Group and is overlain by the Opalinus Clay. The formation comprises siltstones and marls. Additionally, limestones and subordinately also sandstones may occur especially in the Sinemurian part. In the Folded Jura, these sediments may make up the major portion of the Staffelegg Formation. Facies changes may occur within short distances in the Folded Jura. The Staffelegg Formation displays a small thickness compared to the occurrences of the Early Jurassic of southeastern France and southwestern Germany. A gradual decrease in thickness can be detected which continues from southwestern Germany into northern Switzerland.

Formerly, the formation was considered part of the Posidonia Shale, until it was defined as a separate formation by Reisdorf et al. in 2011.

The formation was deposited on the Northern Tethyan Carbonate Platform. The Staffelegg Formation dates from the late Hettangian to early Toarcian.

=== Subdivision ===
The Staffelegg Formation is subdivided into:

- Gross Wolf Member
- Rietheim Member
- Rickenbach Member
- Breitenmatt Member
- Grünschholz Member
- Frick Member
- Fasiswald Member
- Membre du Mont Terri
- Weissenstein Member
- Beggingen Member
- Schambelen Member

== Fossil content ==
Among others, the following fossils have been reported from the formation:

=== Reptiles ===
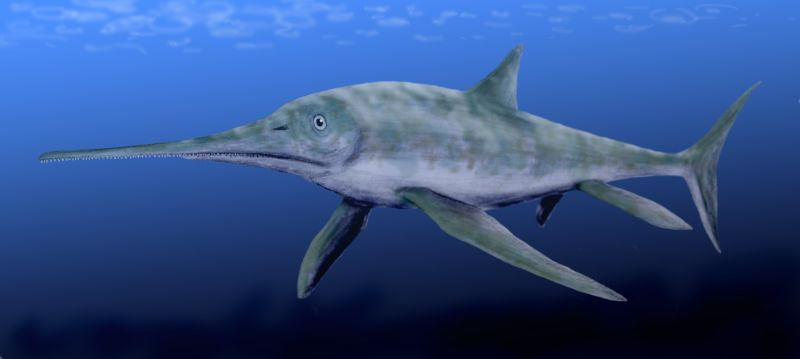
Life restoration of Eurhinosaurus

Ichthyosaurs

- Eurhinosaurus longirostris
- Hauffiopteryx typicus
- Protoichthyosaurus cf. applebyi
- Stenopterygius sp.
- ?Temnodontosaurus sp.

=== Invertebrates ===
Ammonites

- Catacoeloceras raquinianum
