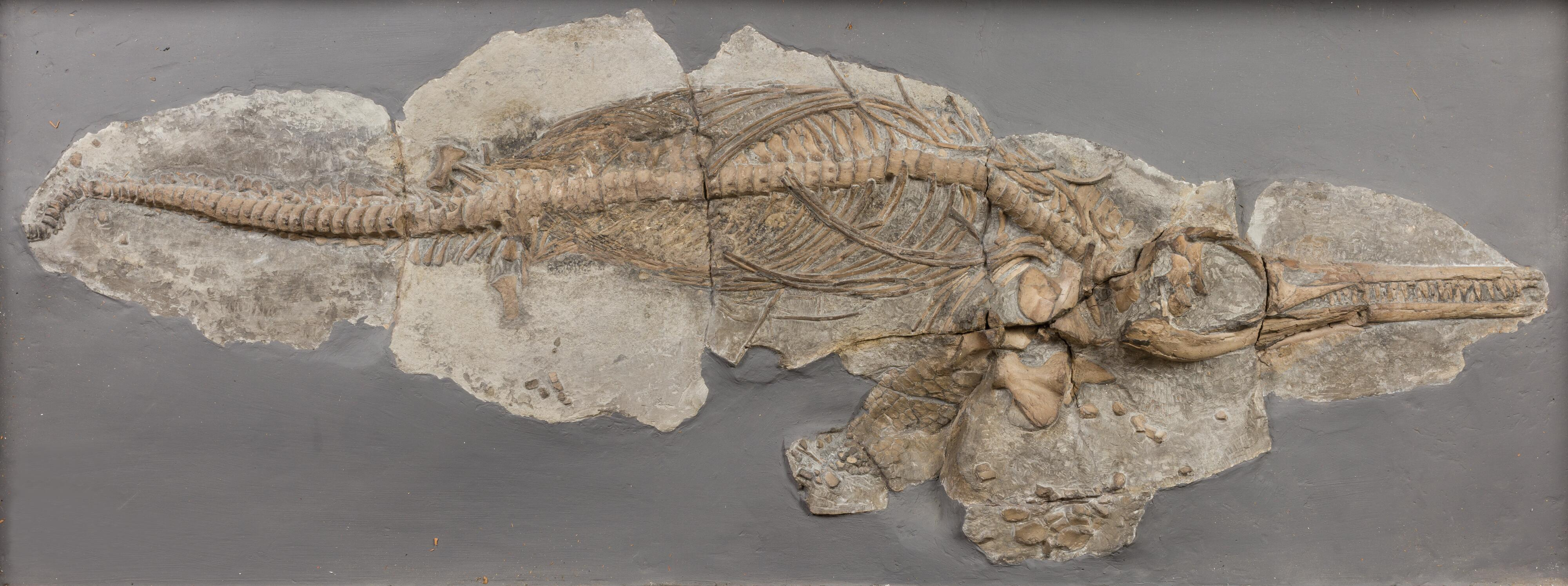
- Paratype skeleton of P. prostaxalis (BRLSI M3553), in Amgueddfa Cymru – Museum Wales

Scientific classification
- Kingdom: Animalia
- Phylum: Chordata
- Class: Reptilia
- Order: †Ichthyosauria
- Family: †Ichthyosauridae
- Genus: †Protoichthyosaurus; Appleby, 1979

Type species
- †Protoichthyosaurus prostaxalis Appleby, 1979

Other species
- †Protoichthyosaurus applebyi Lomax et al., 2017

= Protoichthyosaurus =

Protoichthyosaurus Temporal range: Early Jurassic, Hettangian

Extinct genus of reptiles

Protoichthyosaurus is a genus of ichthyosaur from the Early Jurassic of southern England and possibly Switzerland. First described by Robert M. Appleby in 1979, the taxon was regarded as a junior synonym of Ichthyosaurus between 1997 and 2003. Its validity was restored following a revision published in 2017, which identified several anatomical differences, notably in the arrangement and morphology of the carpal bones, as well as the absence of a fifth digit. Two species are currently recognized: the type species P. prostaxalis and P. applebyi, the latter being described in the 2017 revision. However, that same revision removed a third species originally assigned to the genus, P. prosostealis, due to its similarity to Ichthyosaurus. The species most likely lived during the Hettangian stage, but may have lived as early as the Rhaetian and as late as the Sinemurian.

Species belonging to the genus were medium-sized, with P. prostaxalis measuring no more than 2.5 metres (8 ft 2 in) in length and P. applebyi reaching 2 metres (6 ft 7 in) at most. P. prostaxalis can be distinguished from P. applebyi and from other ichthyosaurs by the large, tall, and triangular maxilla that extends beyond the nasal bones at its front end; a vertically short but thick postorbital bone; and the lacrimal bone having an upward projection longer than its forward projection. Meanwhile, P. applebyi can be distinguished by the narrow, crescent-shaped postorbital; the low maxilla; the nasal reaching to the front of the maxilla; the lacrimal having a forward projection the same length as or longer than the upward projection; and the presence of a plate-like upward projection on the humerus.

== Research history ==
In 1979, Robert M. Appleby noted that some ichthyosaur foreflippers showed unique configurations of bones, and named a new genus, Protoichthyosaurus, for these specimens. He considered the known remains to represent two species; the type species P. prostaxalis and the additional species P. prosostealis. Appleby chose BRLSI M3553 (at the time under the specimen number B. 1963'5/OS), the front part of a skeleton from Street, Somerset, to be the holotype of P. prostaxalis. Appleby assigned an additional four paratype specimens to this species: two partial skeletons (BRLSI M3555 and BRLSI M3563; formerly B. 1963'7/OS & 1963'15/OS), a nearly complete skeleton (OUMNH J.13799), and a isolated flipper (LEICT G454.1951/164). Appleby included only one specimen in P. prosostealis, the well-preserved skeleton BRLSI M3572 (formerly B. 1963'24/OS).

However, in 1997, Michael W. Maisch and Axel Hungerbühler synonymized Protoichthyosaurus with Ichthyosaurus, a position reiterated by Maisch later that year and supported by Christopher McGowan and Ryosuke Motani in 2003. In 2000, Maisch and Andreas Matzke elaborated on this synonymy, noting that the foreflippers of Ichthyosaurus are highly variable and that while those of Protoichthyosaurus were unusual, they did not seem sufficiently different to support the latter's status as a separate genus. They also noted that the traits Appleby used to distinguish Protoichthyosaurus only pertained to foreflipper anatomy and represented the ancestral condition for Ichthyosaurus rather than being novel evolved features. However, Maisch and Matzke noted that P. prostaxalis and P. prosostealis could potentially represent valid species of Ichthyosaurus.

In 2017, Dean Lomax, Judy Massare, and Rashmiben Mistry instead found Protoichthyosaurus to be distinct from Ichthyosaurus, based on features of the skull and shoulder girdle, in addition to those of the foreflipper. Specimens from Dorset, Somerset, Nottinghamshire, Leicestershire, and Warwickshire in England as well as Glamorgan in Wales were considered attributatable to Protoichthyosaurus, making it one of the most widespread Early Jurassic ichthyosaurs of Britain. The authors noted that the variability of foreflipper anatomy in Ichthyosaurus had previously been overestimated. Some of this variability is due to pathologies, such as in the sole specimen of P. prosostealis. Save for an additional flipper bone, this specimen is very similar to Ichthyosaurus and therefore probably an aberrant individual of that genus, rather than a distinct species. Additionally influencing the apparent variability of Ichthyosaurus, many skeletons from historical collections actually represent composites of multiple individuals, and sometimes contain reconstructed parts or were dissassembled then reassembled incorrectly. Many of the original Protoichthyosaurus specimens come from the Charles Moore collection, in which there are multiple composites.

In their review of the genus, Lomax and colleagues also assigned new specimen to P. prostaxalis, including a partial skeleton (AGC 12) and two skulls (BU 5323 and WARMS G347). However, the researchers found BRLSI M3563 to have one foreflipper belonging Protoichthyosaurus associated with a scapula (shoulder blade) and ribs and another foreflipper belonging to Ichthyosaurus, with the rest of the skeleton's affinity being unclear. LEICT G454.1951/164 was discovered to be lost, and may actually be a hindflipper of Ichthyosaurus. The specimen UNM.G.2017.1, a largely authentic skeleton except for probably much of its tail, was assigned to Protoichthyosaurus by Lomax and colleagues. However, they noted that there were differences between its skull and humerus (upper arm bone) and those of P. prostaxalis, so they placed it in a new species, P. applebyi, named in honor of Appleby and his work on ichthyosaurs.

The nominal species Ichthyosaurus fortimanus based on the holotype forefin (NHMUK R.1063) and synonymized with Ichthyosaurus communis by McGowan in 1974, was referred to Protoichthyosaurus, as P. fortimanus by Lomax and Massare in 2018, based on comparisons with known Ichthyosaurus and Protoichthyosaurus species. However, as this foreflipper does not preserve the diagnostic traits of the other two Protoichthyosaurus species, the researchers noted that it could potentially be synonymous with one of them. In the same publication, they also described additional specimens, including a skull assigned to P. applebyi (NHMUK R1164), the second known specimen of that species. In 2019, Lomax, Laura Porro, and Nigel Larkin found that a partial skeleton (BMT 1955.G35.1) initially identified as belonging to Ichthyosaurus communis, instead pertained to P. prostaxalis. This specimen was considerably larger than previous specimens of P. prostaxalis, and its good preservation allowed a three-dimensional reconstruction of the animal's skull to be created. In 2020, Lomax, Massare, and Mark Evans assigned two partial skulls to P. prostaxalis (LEICT G142.1991 & G738.1889) that revealed further data on the skull roof. They also identified two partial forelimbs as belonging to the genus (WARMS G15646 & LDUCZ #X424), but could not assign them to either species with confidence. In 2024, Christian Klug and colleagues referred a partial skull (SMF 46), recovered from the lower Sinemurian-aged Staffelegg Formation in Switzerland, to P. cf. applebyi, originally thought to be an Ichthyosaurus.

== Description ==
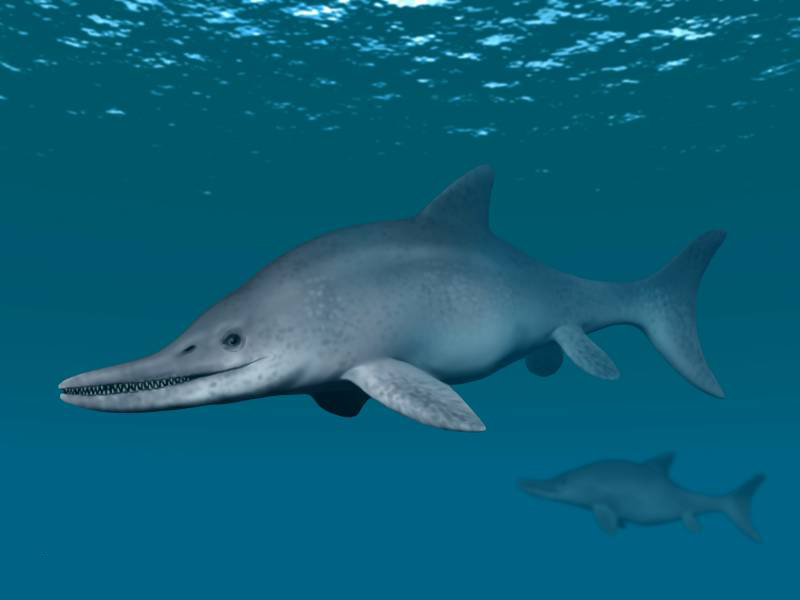
Life reconstruction of P. prostaxalis

Protoichthyosaurus belongs to the group Ichthyosauria, marine reptiles with dolphin-shaped bodies. Like other members of this group, its limbs were modified into flippers and it had a tall tail fin for propulsion. Protoichthyosaurus prostaxilis is a medium-sized ichthyosaur, with the total length of the largest specimen likely somewhere between 3.2–4 metres (10–13 ft), while that of other known specimens likely being below 2.5 metres (8.2 ft). P. applebyi is smaller, probably not exceeding 2 metres (6.6 ft) in total length.

=== Skull ===
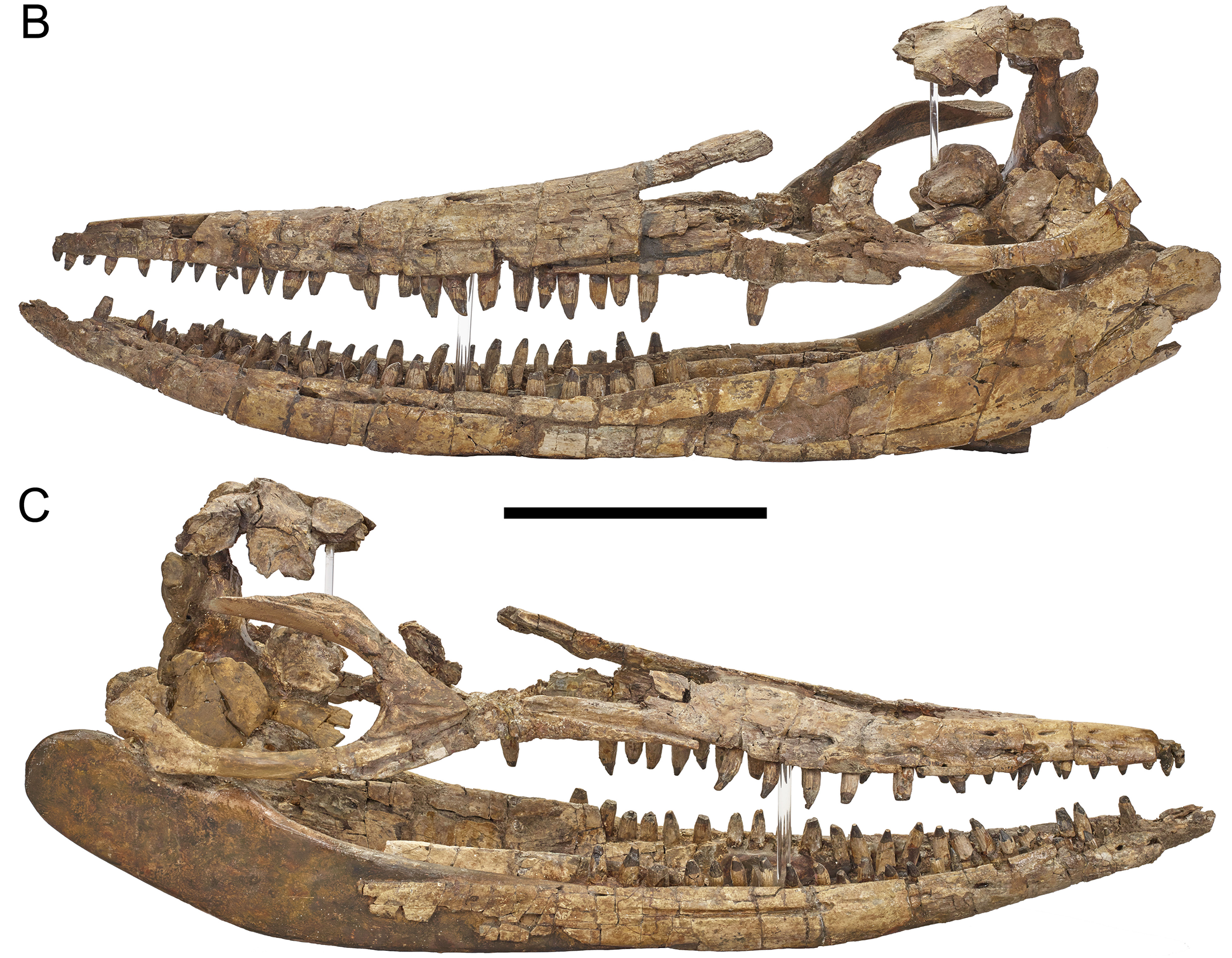
Reconstructed fossil skull of P. prostaxalis (BMT 1955.G35.1)

The external nares (nostril openings) of Protoichthyosaurus are large and roughly triangular in shape. In some specimens, none of their borders are formed by the maxillae (back upper tooth-bearing bones) as they are cut off by the premaxillae (front upper tooth-bearing bones) and lacrimals (paired bones in front of the eye sockets). The maxillae bear elongate, slim front portions are not symmetrical. The maxillae of P. prostaxilis are unique in shape; they are large, tall, and triangular with at least half the length of their forwards-projecting processes in front of the external nares; these bones extend further forwards than the nasals (a pair of skull roof bones located towards the front of the skull). While the maxillae also extend in front of the external nares in P. applebyi, in this species, the maxillae are low and the nasals extend further forwards than they do. The teeth of Protoichthyosaurus bear large grooves reaching the crowns' bases and are firmly rooted.

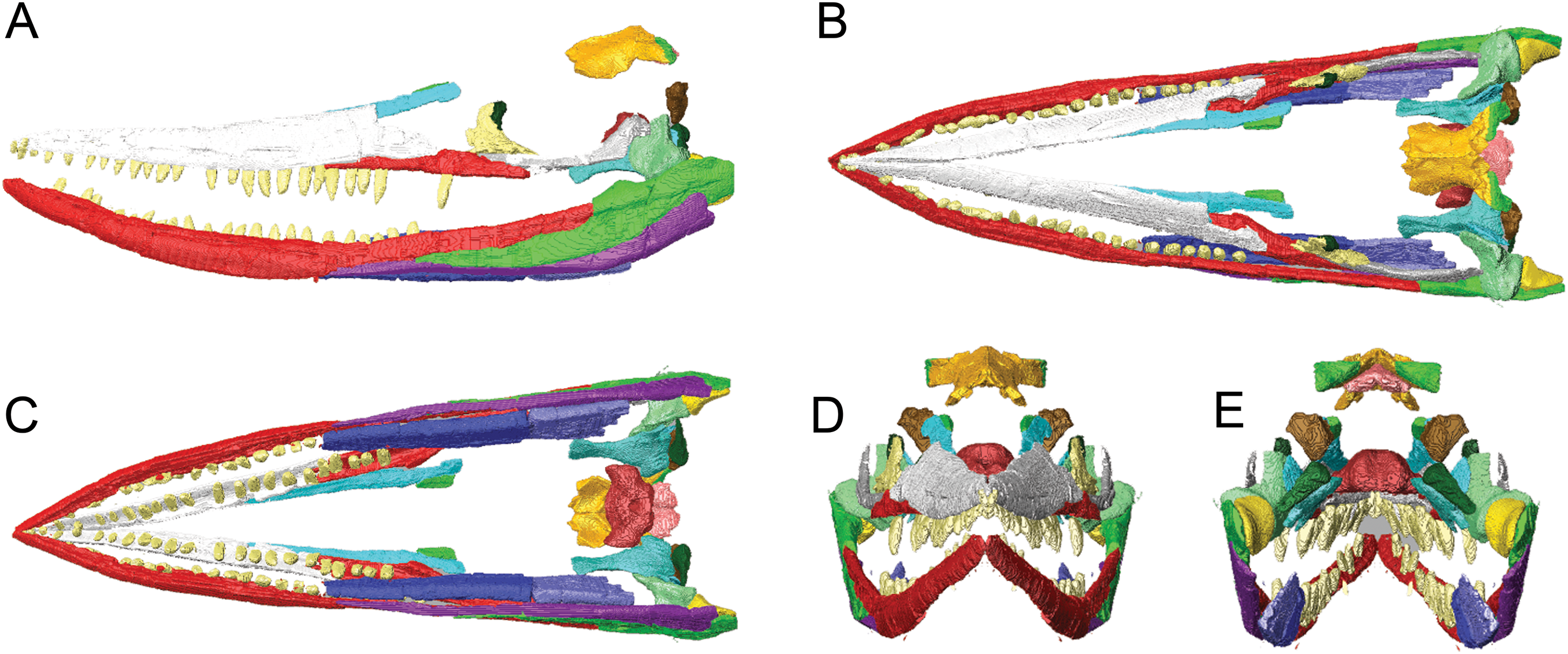
3D reconstruction of the skull

The nasals have wide rear ends. There is an opening between the nasals towards their rear ends that, in some specimens, can be quite long and pronounced. The lacrimals of Protoichthyosaurus are three-pronged. The upper prong is much longer than the front prong in P. prostaxilis, a morphology unique to this species. In P. applebyi, the forwards-projected prong is at least as long, if not longer, than the upper one. The forwards projections of a pair of skull roof bones known as the prefrontals (a pair of skull roof bones) isolates the upper prongs of the lacrimals from the orbital rim, similar to some species of Ichthyosaurus. The postorbitals (paired bones behind the orbits) of P. prostaxalis are unique in shape, being short vertically but wide from front to back and roughly rectangular. Like Ichthyosaurus communis, they form less than half of the rear edges of the orbits in this species. In P. applebyi, the postorbitals are instead thin and crescent-shaped, tall but narrow from front to back. Additionally, like many species of Ichthyosaurus, the postorbitals of P. applebyi form significantly more than half of the rear rims of the orbits.

Measured from their tops to their bottoms, the prefronals have wide front ends but narrow rear ends in P. prostaxalis, as in some Ichthyosaurus species. The pineal foramen (a small opening on the top of the skull) is positioned between two pairs of skull roof bones, the frontals and parietals, as seen in many other Early Jurassic ichthyosaurs, with the rear edge of the foramen formed by the parietals. The squamosals (paired bones near the rear of the skull) of P. prostaxalis are shaped like rectangles and each bear a downwards-pointing, triangular projection on their rear lower corners, a morphology also seen in Ichthyosaurus somersetensis.

=== Postcranial skeleton ===
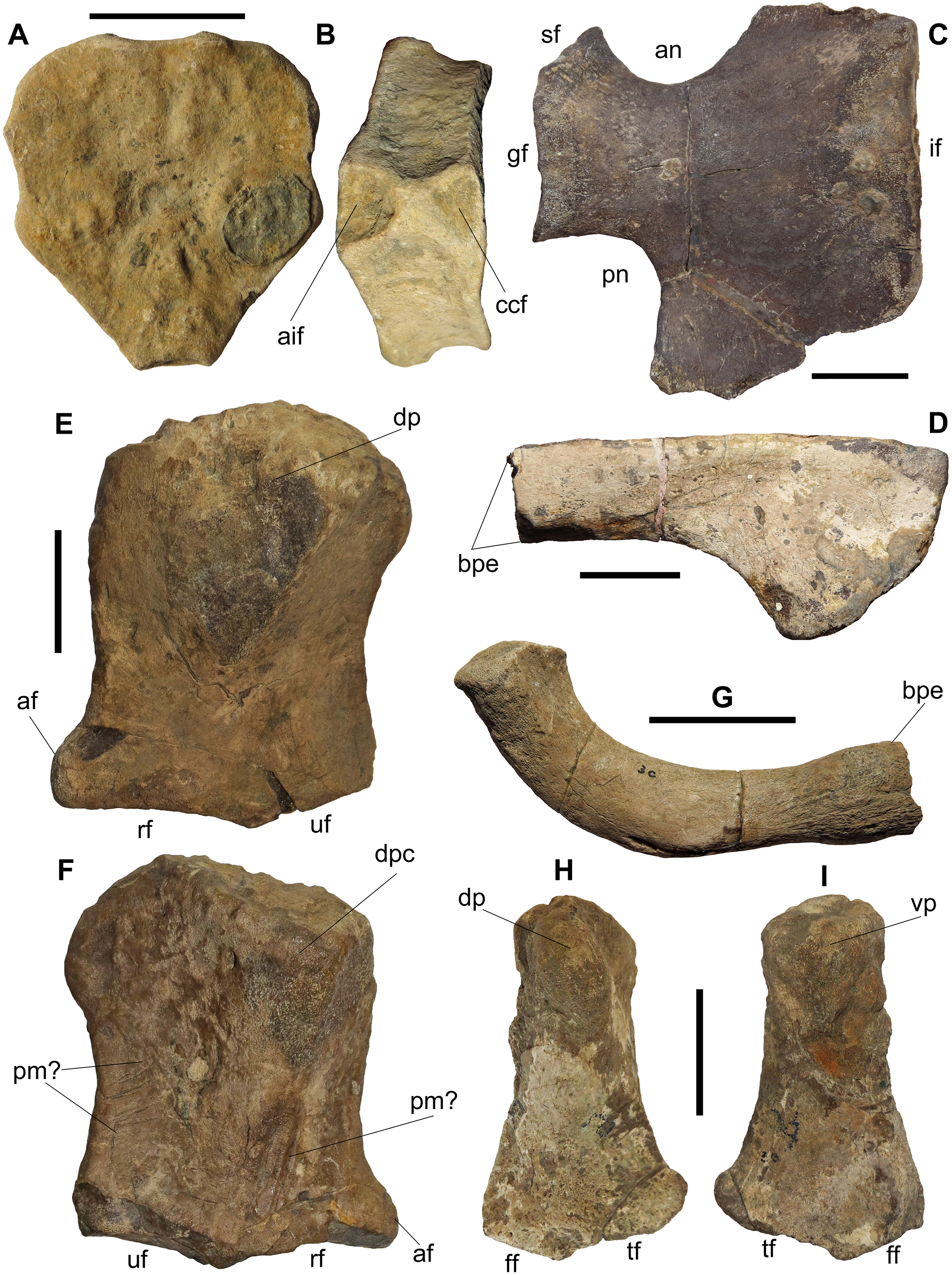
Postcranial elements of BMT 1955.G35.1: axis (A–B), left coracoid (C), left scapula (D), left humerus (E–F), ilium (G), and right femur (H–I).

The scapulae of Protoichthyosaurus are elongate. While the front edges of each scapula are slightly expanded, they lack prominent eminences known as acromion processes. The coracoids (paired shoulder bones positioned below the scapulae) bear broad notches on both their front and back edges. Both ends of each humerus are about the same width, although the middle of the bone is slightly constricted, as also seen in Ichthyosaurus. The humeri of P. prostaxalis are robust. In this species, a small projection known as the dorsal process on each humerus is located along the bone's midline and does not reach very far down its length, similar to the condition in Ichthyosaurus somersetensis. The dorsal processes of P. applebyi are also located along the midlines of the humeri, though in this species they are vaguely plate-like and are present as thin ridges, similar to the condition in I. larkini.

Uniquely in Protoichthyosaurus, distal carpal 3 articulates with the ulnare (the carpal below the ulna). The intermedium (middle upper wrist bone) does not touch distal carpal 4, another characteristic unique to Protoichthyosaurus. In fact, distal carpal 3 is the only one of the distal carpals to have extensive contact with the intermedium. There are three distal (lower) carpals in Protoichthyosaurus, but due to digit II bifurcating, there are four metacarpals, a configuration known only in Protoichthyosaurus. This bifurcation nearly entirely intrudes between distal carpals 2 and 3 and separates them, a trait unique to Protoichthyosaurus. There are a total of three primary digits (digits that originate from the wrist) in Protoichthyosaurus, although digit V is absent. Digit II forks again further down the flipper, similar to Ichthyosaurus. Thus, the two bifurcations provide a total of five digits per foreflipper. The individual bones composing these digits, the phalanges, are roughly rectangular in shape in the upper part of the flipper, though those further towards it tip are rounded. The phalanges are tightly packed together. The upper end of each femur (thigh bone) is robust in P. prostaxalis, while the middle part is thinner and the lower end is wider than the upper. There are three bones in the distal tarsal row, the third row of bones below the femur, in each hindflipper of P. prostaxalis.

== Classification ==
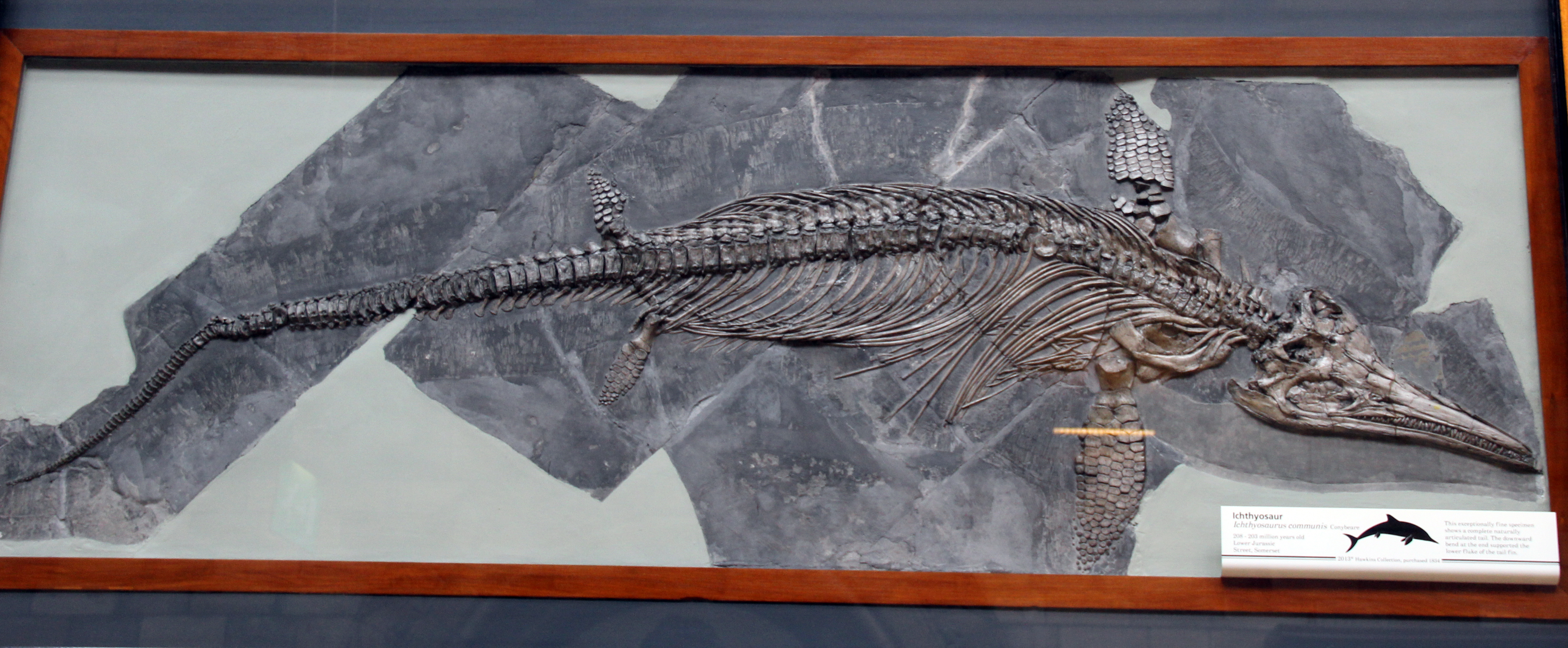
Fossil skeleton of Ichthyosaurus somersetensis, a closely related taxon related to Protoichthyosaurus.

It was once thought that ichthyosaurs consisted of two main lineages, the latipinnates and longipinnates, which diverged in the Triassic and both persisted into the Cretaceous. These groups were mainly differentiated based on wrist structure, though they also differed in other features of the forelimb and skull. However, in 1979, Appleby noted that Protoichthyosaurus, as well as Leptonectes, both had foreflipper morphologies intermediate between the latipinnate and longipinnate conditions, despite living in the Early Jurassic. Appleby restudied the mixosaurids, which were thought to be the ancestors of later latipinnates, and found them to be too distinct for this position. Instead, he considered mixosaurids to belong to a group of their own, while the later latipinnates descended from the longipinnates. He created a new group, Heteropinnatoidea, for Leptonectes and Protoichthyosaurus, with the latter being placed in the new family Protoichthyosauridae and considered more similar to the latipinnates.

The latipinnate-longipinnate distinction in ichthyosaurs was abandoned as a method of classification since studies such as Appleby's revealed that forefin morphology alone did not always follow trends shown elsewhere in the skeleton. In their 2017 revision of Protoichthyosaurus, Lomax and colleagues placed it within the family Ichthyosauridae due to the similarities between it and Ichthyosaurus and the results of their phylogenetic analysis, which found the two genera to be sister taxa. Ichthyosauridae was in turn classified within the larger group Parvipelvia. Similar results were recovered by Erin E. Maxwell and Dirley Cortés in 2020. When Lomax and his colleagues describe the leptonectid genus Xiphodracon in a 2025 paper, they recover both species of Protoichthyosaurus within a clade comprising the six species of Ichthyosaurus, rendering the latter a paraphyletic taxon. A simplified version of their cladogram is shown below:

- Neoichthyosauria
  - Temnodontosauridae
  - - Temnodontosaurus azerguensis
    - - Temnodontosaurus crassimanus
      - - Ichthyosauridae
          - Malawania anachronus
          - - Ichthyosaurus conybeari
            - - - Ichthyosaurus larkini
                - - Protoichthyosaurus prostaxalis
                  - Protoichthyosaurus applebyi
              - - Ichthyosaurus somersetensis
                - - Ichthyosaurus breviceps
                  - - Ichthyosaurus anningae
                    - Ichthyosaurus communis
        - - Leptonectidae
          - - Stenopterygius spp.
            - - Chacaicosaurus cayi
              - Ophthalmosauria
