= Douglas Morton =

Douglas Morton may refer to:

- Douglas Morton (politician) (1916–2001), Canadian soldier, lawyer, politician, and judge
- Douglas Michael Mortonn (1924–2003), British petroleum geologist
- Doug Morton (artist) (1926–2004), Canadian artist

== See also ==
- Douglas Morton Dunlop (1909–1987), British orientalist
