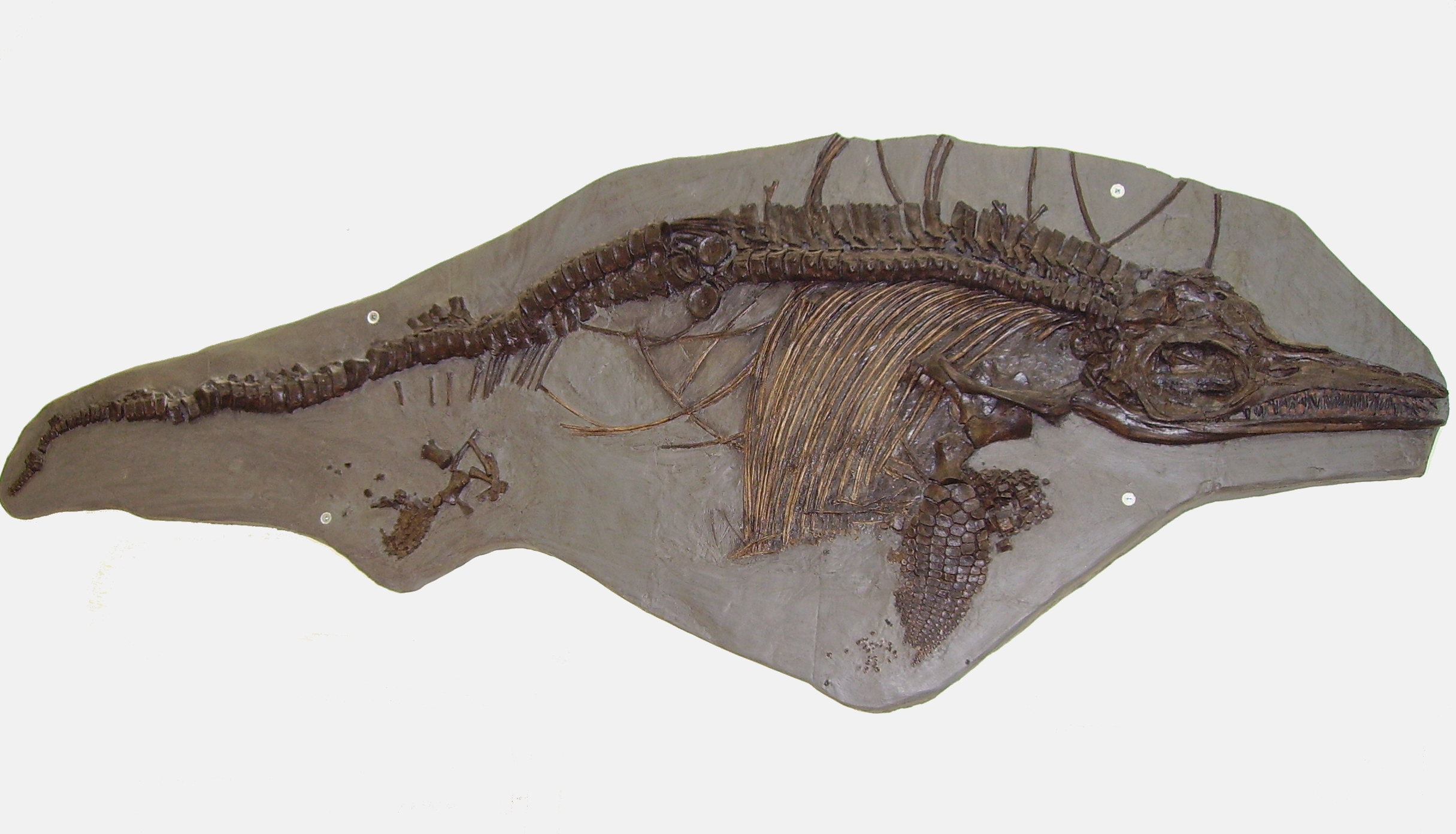
- Fossil specimen of Ichthyosaurus breviceps

Scientific classification
- Kingdom: Animalia
- Phylum: Chordata
- Class: Reptilia
- Order: †Ichthyosauria
- Node: †Thunnosauria
- Family: †Ichthyosauridae; Bonaparte, 1841

Type species
- †Ichthyosaurus communis Conybeare, 1822

Subgroups
- †Ichthyosaurus; †Malawania; †Protoichthyosaurus

= Ichthyosauridae =

Ichthyosauridae Temporal range: latest Triassic-Early Jurassic, 207–185 Ma Possible Early Cretaceous ghost lineage

Extinct family of reptiles

Ichthyosauridae is an extinct family of thunnosaur ichthyosaurs from the latest Triassic and Early Jurassic (Rhaetian to Pliensbachian stages) of Europe, and possibly also from the middle Early Cretaceous (Hauterivian or Barremian stage) of Iraq. Named by Charles Lucien Bonaparte, in 1841, it is usually thought to contain a single genus, Ichthyosaurus, which is known from several species from the Early Jurassic. In 2013, Fischer et al. named and described Malawania anachronus from the middle Early Cretaceous of Iraq. It was found to share several synapomorphies with the type species of this family, Ichthyosaurus communis, and a large phylogenetic analysis recovered these species as sister taxa. Despite its geologically younger age, M. anachronus was also assigned to Ichthyosauridae.

== Phylogeny ==
Fischer et al. (2013) applied the name Ichthyosauridae Bonaparte, 1841 for the clade that contains Malawania anachronus and Ichthyosaurus communis. This clade was recovered in the phylogenetic analysis that was based on the largest currently available data matrix of parvipelvian species. Most other phylogenetic analyses, that were based on smaller matrices, also recovered this clade or found M. anachronus to be in a more basal position. Ichthyosauridae was recovered as the sister taxon of Baracromia, a clade first defined by Fischer et al. (2013) that includes all other thunnosaurs. The cladogram below follows the large phylogenetic analysis of Fischer et al. (2013).

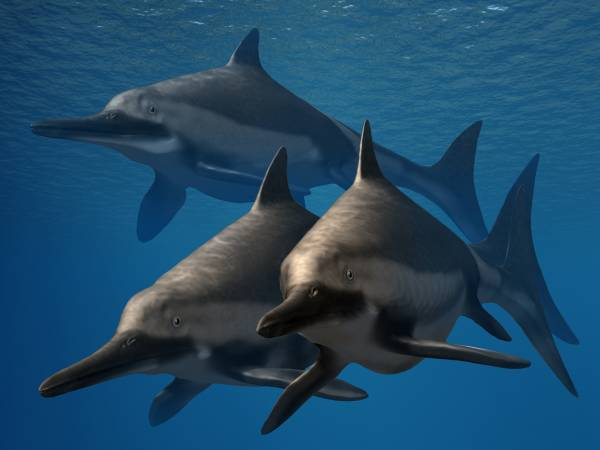
Life reconstruction of Ichthyosaurus anningae

== Cladogram ==
- - Mikadocephalus gracilirostris
  - Parvipelvia
    - Hudsonelpidia brevirostris
    - - Macgowania janiceps
      - Neoichthyosauria
        - - Temnodontosaurus
          - - Leptonectes tenuirostris
            - - Eurhinosaurus longirostris
              - Excalibosaurus costini
        - - Suevoleviathan disinteger
          - - Hauffiopteryx typicus
            - Thunnosauria
              - Ichthyosauridae
                - Ichthyosaurus communis
                - Malawania anachronus
              - Baracromia
                - Stenopterygius quadriscissus
                - - Chacaicosaurus cayi
                  - Ophthalmosauridae
                    - Arthropterygius chrisorum
                    - - Ophthalmosaurinae
                        - Mollesaurus periallus
                        - - Ophthalmosaurus icenicus (type species)
                          - - Baptanodon natans ("O." natans)
                            - Acamptonectes densus
                      - Platypterygiinae
                        - - Brachypterygius extremus
                          - - Maiaspondylus lindoei
                            - - Aegirosaurus leptospondylus
                              - Sveltonectes insolitus
                        - - "Platypterygius" hercynicus
                          - - Caypullisaurus bonapartei
                            - - Athabascasaurus bitumineus
                              - "Platypterygius" australis
