= Staffelegg Pass =

Mountain pass in Aargau, Switzerland

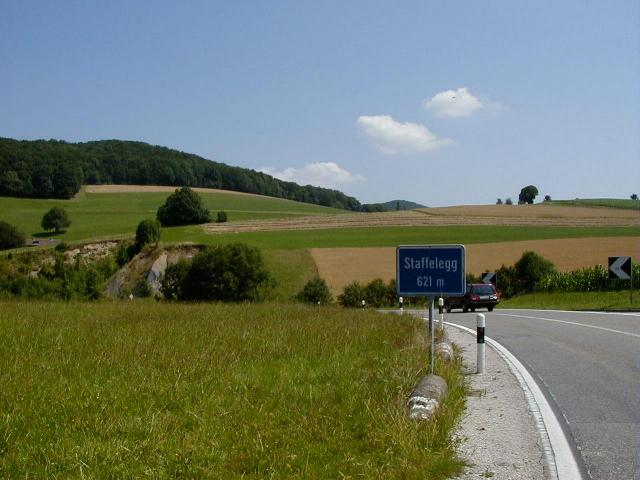
- Staffelegg Pass
- Interactive map of Staffelegg Pass
- Elevation: 621 m (2,037 ft)

Third Approach
- Location: Switzerland
- Coordinates: 47.43382°N 8.060507°E

Staffelegg Pass is a mountain pass in the canton of Aargau in Switzerland.

It connects Küttigen and Asp. The postal bus route from Frick to Aarau goes over the pass, and there is a restaurant at the summit.
