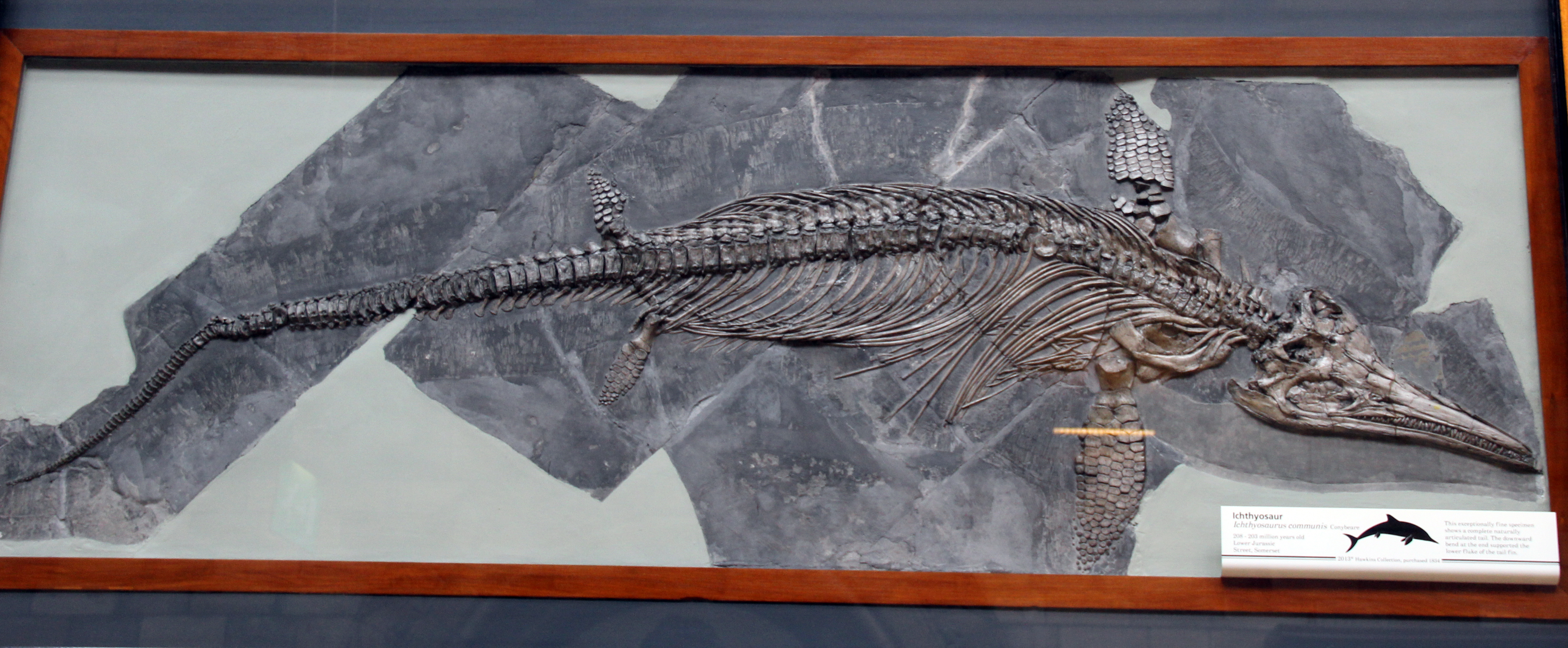
- Fossil specimen of Ichthyosaurus somersetensis at Natural History Museum, London (NHMUK PV OR 2013)

Scientific classification
- Kingdom: Animalia
- Phylum: Chordata
- Class: Reptilia
- Order: †Ichthyosauria
- Family: †Ichthyosauridae
- Genus: †Ichthyosaurus; Beche and Conybeare, 1821

Type species
- †Ichthyosaurus communis Beche and Conybeare, 1822

Other species
- †I. breviceps Owen, 1881; †I. conybeari Lydekker, 1888; †I. anningae Lomax & Massare, 2015; †I. larkini Lomax & Massare, 2017; †I. somersetensis Lomax & Massare, 2017

= Ichthyosaurus =

Ichthyosaurus Temporal range: Jurassic Possible Late Triassic (Rhaetian) record, but yet to be confirmed 199.5–192.9 Ma

Genus of extinct marine reptile, type genus of Ichthyosauria

Ichthyosaurus (derived from Greek ἰχθύς (ichthys) meaning 'fish' and σαῦρος (sauros) meaning 'lizard') is an extinct genus of ichthyosaurs from the Early Jurassic (Hettangian - Pliensbachian) of Europe (Belgium, England, Germany and Portugal). Some specimens of the ichthyosaurid Protoichthyosaurus from England and Switzerland have been erroneously referred to this genus in the past. It is among the best known ichthyosaur genera, as it is the type genus of the order Ichthyosauria.

== History of discovery ==
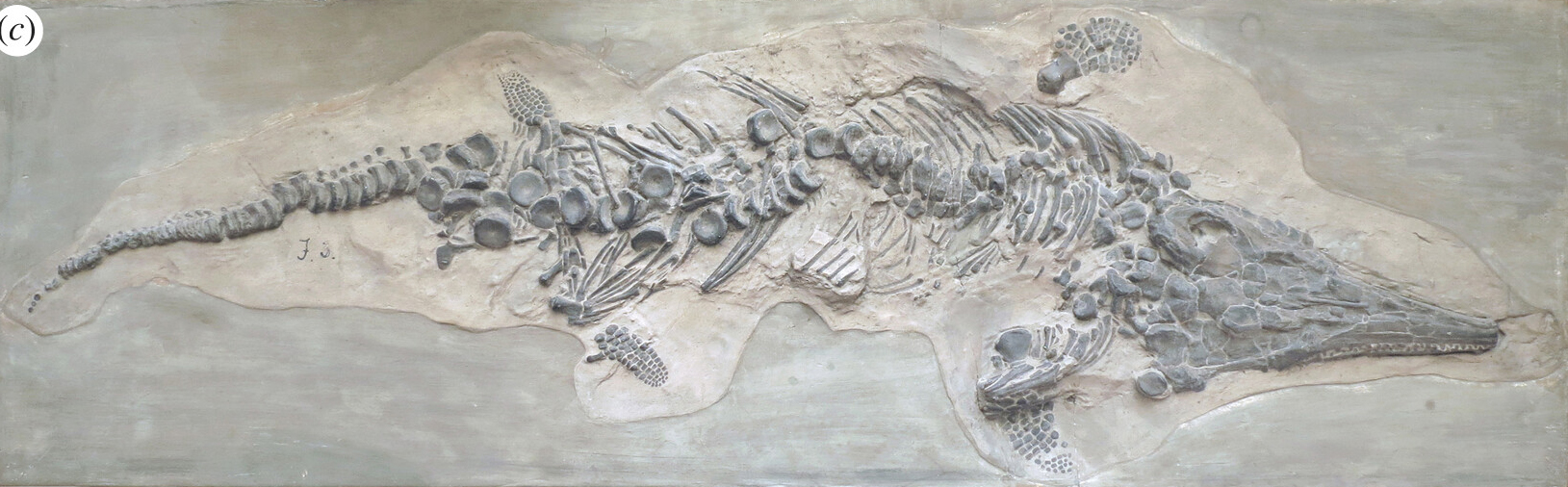
Cast of the first known complete Ichthyosaurus specimen (originally referred to as Proteosaurus), which was destroyed during World War 2

Ichthyosaurus was the first complete fossil to be discovered in the early 19th century by Mary Anning in England; the holotype of I. communis, no coll. number given, was a fairly complete specimen discovered by Mary and Joseph Anning around 1814 in Lyme Regis but was reported as lost by McGowan (1974) in his review of the latipinnate ichthyosaurs of England. The name Ichthyosaurus was first used by Charles Konig in 1818, but it was not used in a formal scientific description, with the earliest described ichthyosaur being Proteosaurus by James Everard Home in 1819 for a skeleton which is now attributed to Temnodontosaurus platyodon. Henry Beche and William Conybeare in 1821 considered Ichthyosaurus to have taxonomic priority over Proteosaurus and named the species I. communis based on BMNH 2149 (now NHMUK PV R1158), a now partially lost specimen now assigned to Temnodontosaurus that was discovered and collected between 1811 and 1812. One specimen that Home had assigned to Proteosaurus was the first complete ichthyosaur skeleton known, but it was destroyed during World War 2. Two casts were rediscovered in 2022, showing that the specimen belonged to Ichthyosaurus, but of uncertain species. During the 19th century, almost all fossil ichthyosaurs were attributed to Ichthyosaurus, resulting in the genus having over 50 species by 1900. These species were subsequently moved to separate genera or synonymised with other species.

I. anningae, described in 2015 from a fossil found in the early 1980s in Dorset, England, was named after Anning. The fossil was acquired by Doncaster Museum and Art Gallery, where it was misidentified as a plaster cast. In 2008, Dean Lomax, from the University of Manchester, recognised it as genuine and worked with Judy Massare, of the State University of New York, to establish it as a new species. In 2026, a new specimen from Spain in the Lower Jurassic (Pliensbachian) Rodiles Formation has been reported.

== Description ==
Size comparison

Ichthyosaurus was smaller than most of its relatives, with the largest specimen of I. somersetensis measuring up to 3–3.3 m (9.8–10.8 ft) in length. In comparison, other species were much smaller, with the type species I. communis reaching up to 2 metres (6.6 ft) in length, I. larkini probably up to 2.5 metres (8.2 ft), I. anningae up to 1.8 metres (5.9 ft), I. breviceps up to 1.9 metres (6.2 ft), and I. conybeari up to 1.5 metres (4.9 ft). Many Ichthyosaurus fossils are well-preserved and fully articulated. Some fossils still had baby specimens inside them, indicating that Ichthyosaurus was viviparous. Similar finds in the related Stenopterygius also show this. Jurassic ichthyosaurs had a fleshy dorsal fin on their back as well as a large caudal fin. Icthyosaurus is distinguished from other ichthyosaurs by having a wide forefin with 5 or more digits with an anterior digital bifurcation, but the morphology of the humerus and coracoids are also distinct from that of other Lower Jurassic ichthyosaurs, as is the arrangement of the dermal bones, though the suture lines used to diagnose these are not always visible.

== Classification ==
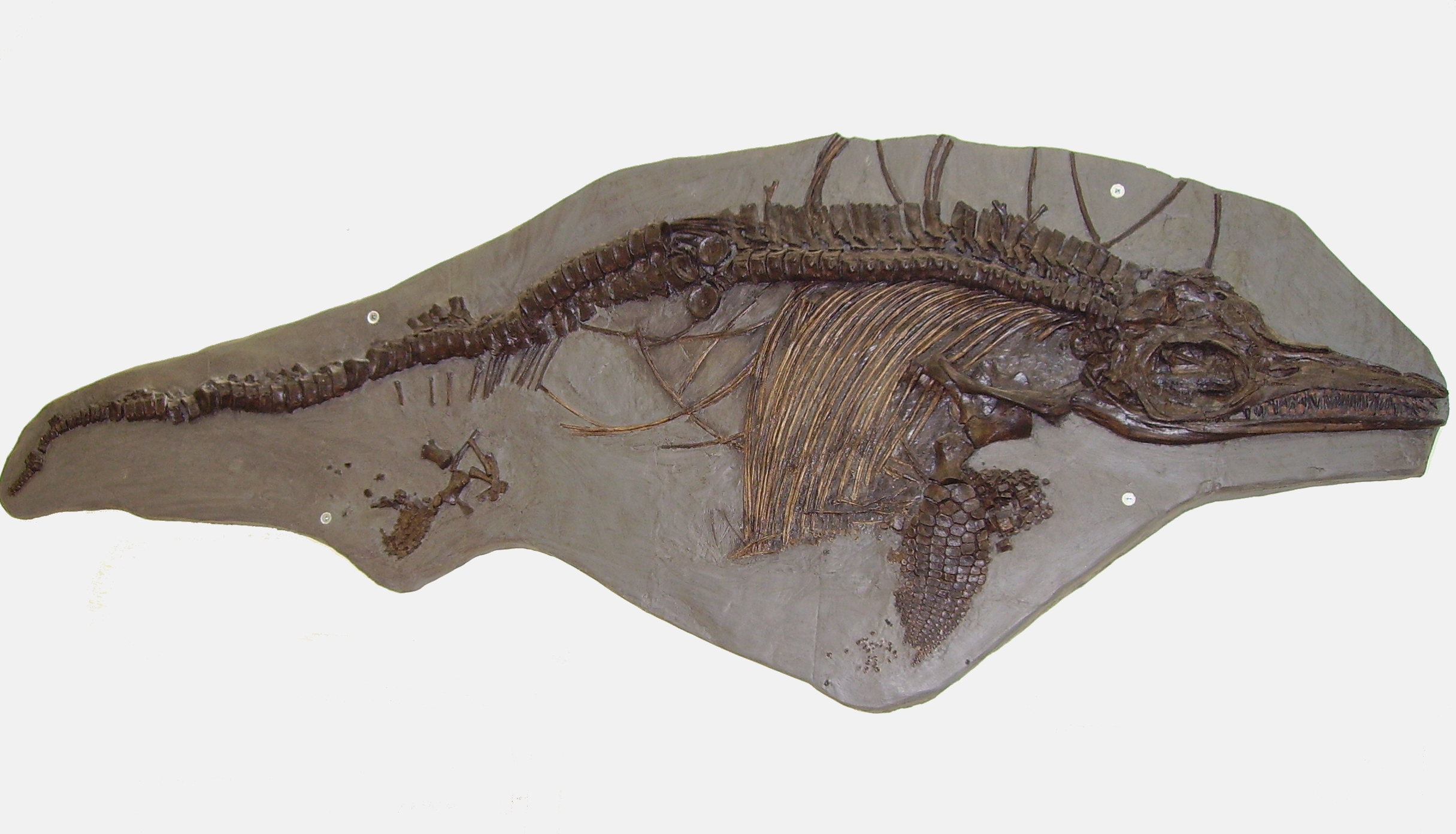
I. breviceps fossil in Charmouth Heritage Coast Centre

I. somersetensis fossil in Academy of Natural Sciences of Philadelphia

- †Ichthyosaurus communis (Beche and Conybeare, 1822)
- †Ichthyosaurus breviceps (Owen, 1881)
- †Ichthyosaurus conybeari (Lydekker, 1888)
- †Ichthyosaurus anningae (Lomax and Massare, 2015)
- †Ichthyosaurus larkini (Lomax and Massare, 2017)
- †Ichthyosaurus somersetensis (Lomax and Massare, 2017)

=== Cladogram ===
This cladogram follows the topology from a 2010 analysis by Patrick S. Druckenmiller and Erin E. Maxwell.

- Thunnosauria
  - Ichthyosaurus
  - - Stenopterygius
    - - Baptanodon
      - Ophthalmosauridae
        - - Aegirosaurus
          - Ophthalmosaurus (type species)
        - - Mollesaurus
          - - Athabascasaurus
            - - Brachypterygius
              - - Arthropterygius
                - Caypullisaurus
                - "Platypterygius" hercynicus
                - "Platypterygius" australis (=Longirostria)
                - Platypterygius (type species)
                - - Maiaspondylus
                  - "Platypterygius" americanus (=Tenuirostria)

== Palaeobiology ==
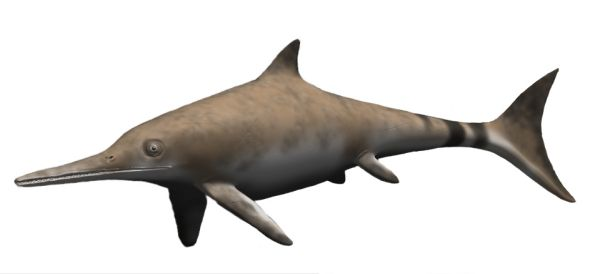
Life reconstruction of Ichthyosaurus communis

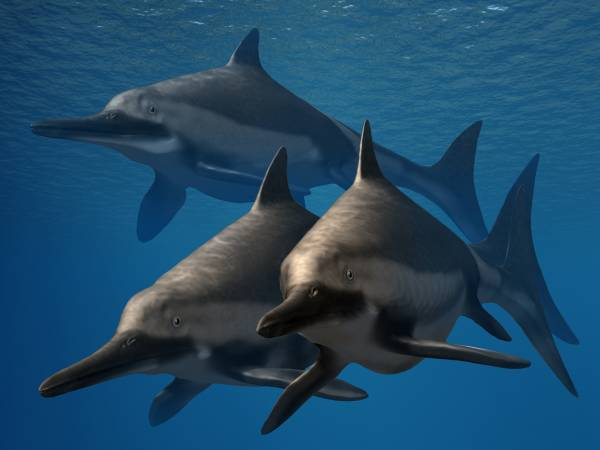
Restoration of three Ichthyosaurus anningae

Ichthyosaurus is suggested to have been a ram feeder, with the morphology of its hyobranchial apparatus suggesting that it was incapable of suction feeding, using the jaws and teeth alone to capture prey. Ichthyosaurus is thought to have been a pursuit predator that was capable of sustained swift swimming via thunniform locomotion. Stomach contents of Ichthyosaurus anningae indicate that it fed on cephalopods (likely belemnites) and fish. Like other ichthyosaurs, it likely relied on its sense of sight, possibly in combination with olfaction.

It was initially believed that Ichthyosaurus laid eggs on land, but fossil evidence shows that in fact the females gave birth to live young. As such, they were well-adapted to life as fully pelagic organisms (i.e. they never came onto land). Three pregnant females are known, all of the subspecies I. somersetensis. Although none of the fetuses show a clear birth orientation it is likely they exited tail-first, a common feature in highly aquatic vertebrates.

== Cultural significance ==
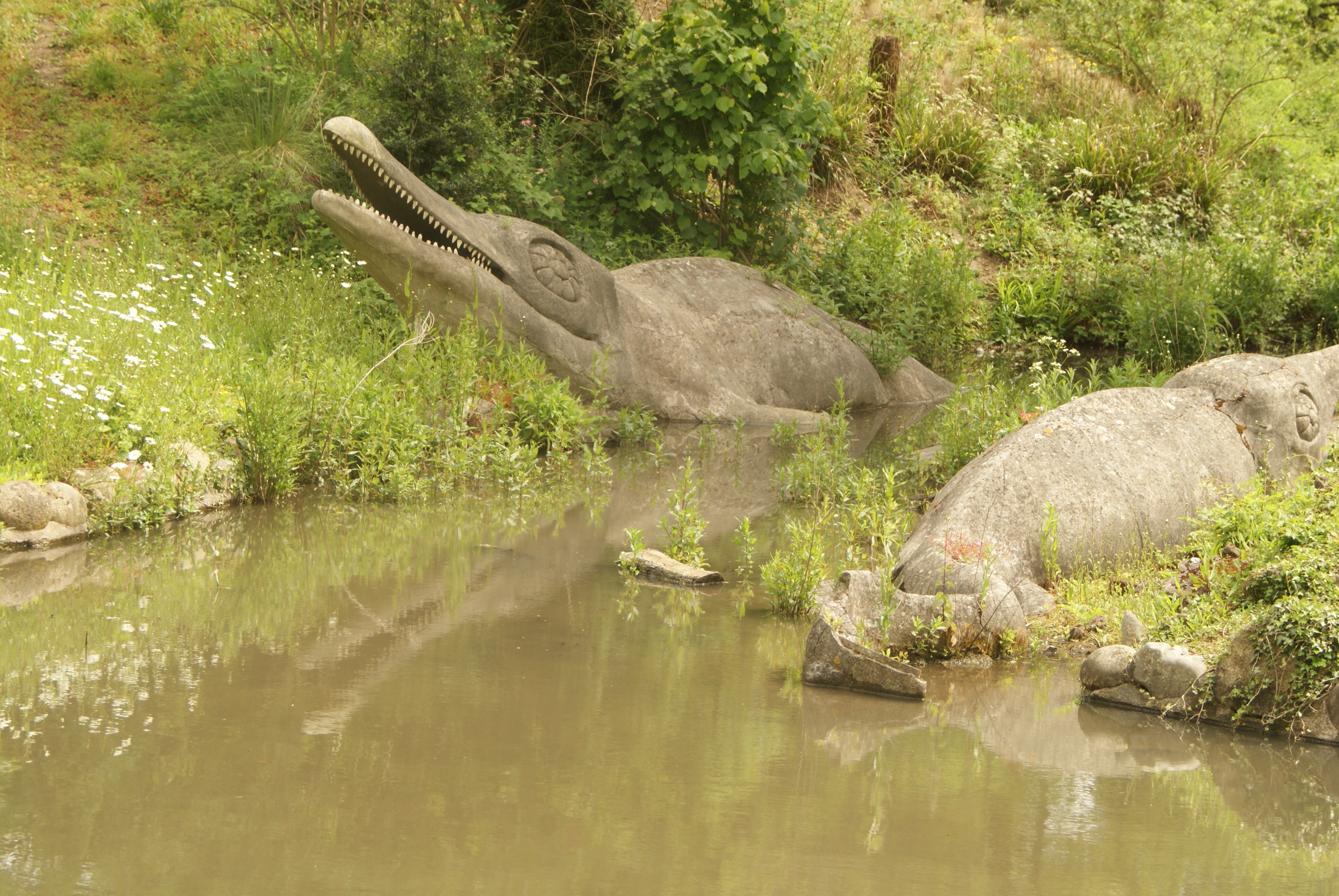
Historically important sculpture of Ichthyosaurus communis (left) in Crystal Palace Park

Joseph Scheffels's poem Der Ichthyosaurus describes its extinction in humouristic verses. A monument on Hohentwiel cites it as well. The poem has been translated among others by Charles Leland. Some of the stanzas:

The rushes are strangely rustling,
The ocean uncannily gleams,
As with tears in his eyes down gushing,
An Ichthyosaurus swims.

He bewails the frightful corruption
Of his age, for an awful tone
Has lately been noticed by many
In the Lias formation shown.

== See also ==
- List of ichthyosaurs
- Timeline of ichthyosaur research
