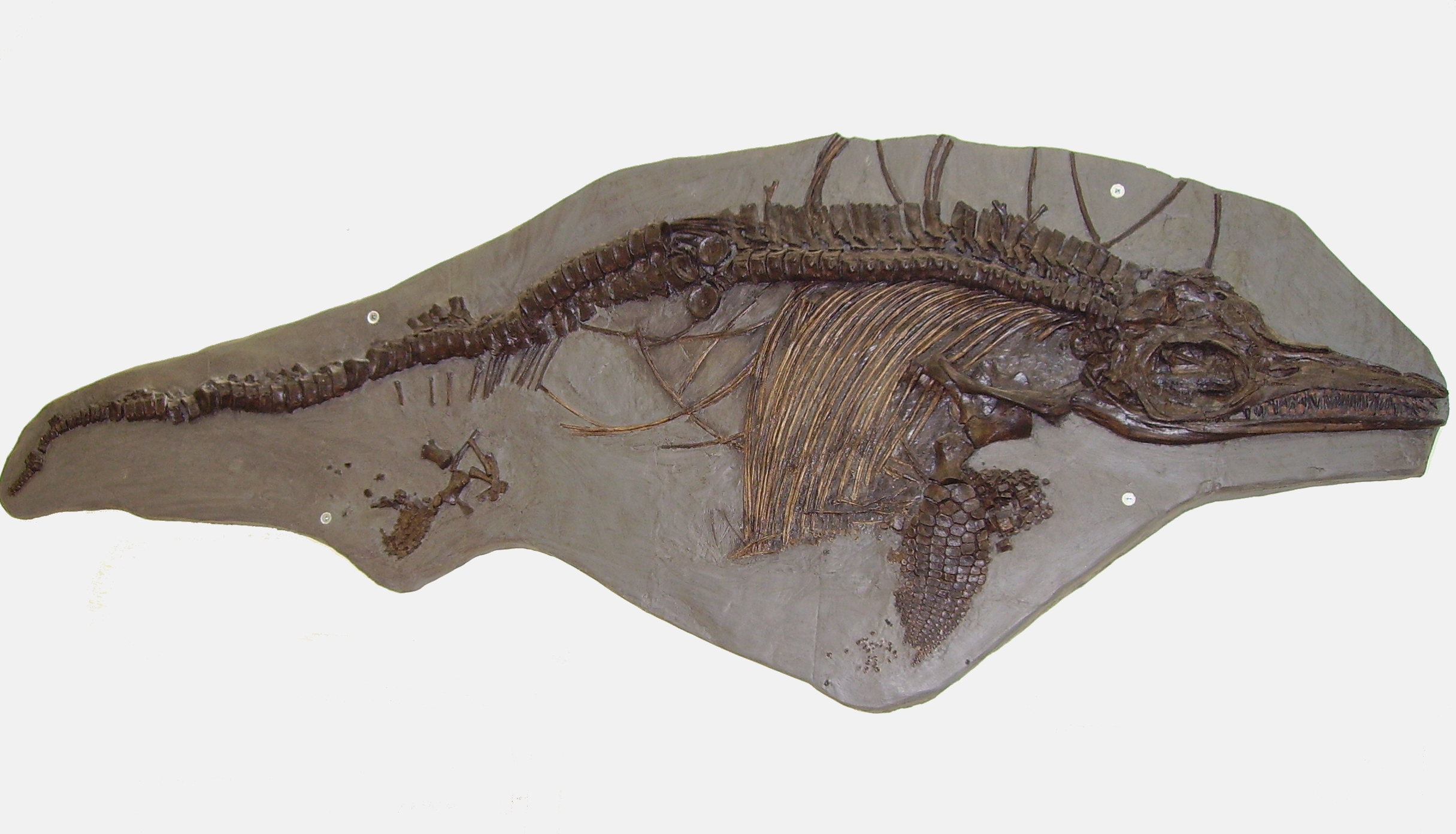
- Ichthyosaurus breviceps fossil

Scientific classification
- Domain: Eukaryota
- Kingdom: Animalia
- Phylum: Chordata
- Class: Reptilia
- Order: †Ichthyosauria
- Node: †Neoichthyosauria
- Node: †Thunnosauria; Motani, 1999

Subgroups
- †Ichthyosauridae; †Baracromia; †Chacaicosaurus; †Gadusaurus; †Stenopterygiidae; †Ophthalmosauridae

= Thunnosauria =

Thunnosaurians Temporal range: Early Jurassic-Late Cretaceous, 199.6–93.5 Ma

Extinct clade of reptiles

Thunnosauria (Greek for "tuna lizard" – thunnos meaning "tuna" and sauros meaning "lizard") is an extinct clade of parvipelvian ichthyosaurs from the Early Jurassic to the early Late Cretaceous (Hettangian–Cenomanian) of Asia, Australia, Europe, North America, and South America. Named by Ryosuke Motani in 1999, it contains the basal taxa Ichthyosaurus and Stenopterygius and the family Ophthalmosauridae. In thunnosaurs, the fore fin is at least twice as long as the hind fin.

== Phylogeny ==
Thunnosauria is a node-based taxon defined in 1999 as "the last common ancestor of Ichthyosaurus communis and Stenopterygius quadriscissus and all of its descendants". The cladogram below follows the topology from a 2010 analysis by Patrick S. Druckenmiller and Erin E. Maxwell.

- Thunnosauria
  - Ichthyosaurus
  - - Stenopterygius
    - - "Ophthalmosaurus" natans
      - Ophthalmosauridae
        - - Aegirosaurus
          - Ophthalmosaurus
        - - Mollesaurus
          - - Athabascasaurus
            - - Brachypterygius
              - - Arthropterygius
                - Caypullisaurus
                - "Platypterygius" hercynicus
                - "Platypterygius" australis
                - Platypterygius
                - - Maiaspondylus
                  - "Platypterygius" americanus
