= Douglas Michael Morton =

British petroleum geologist (1924–2003)

D.M. ("Mike") Morton
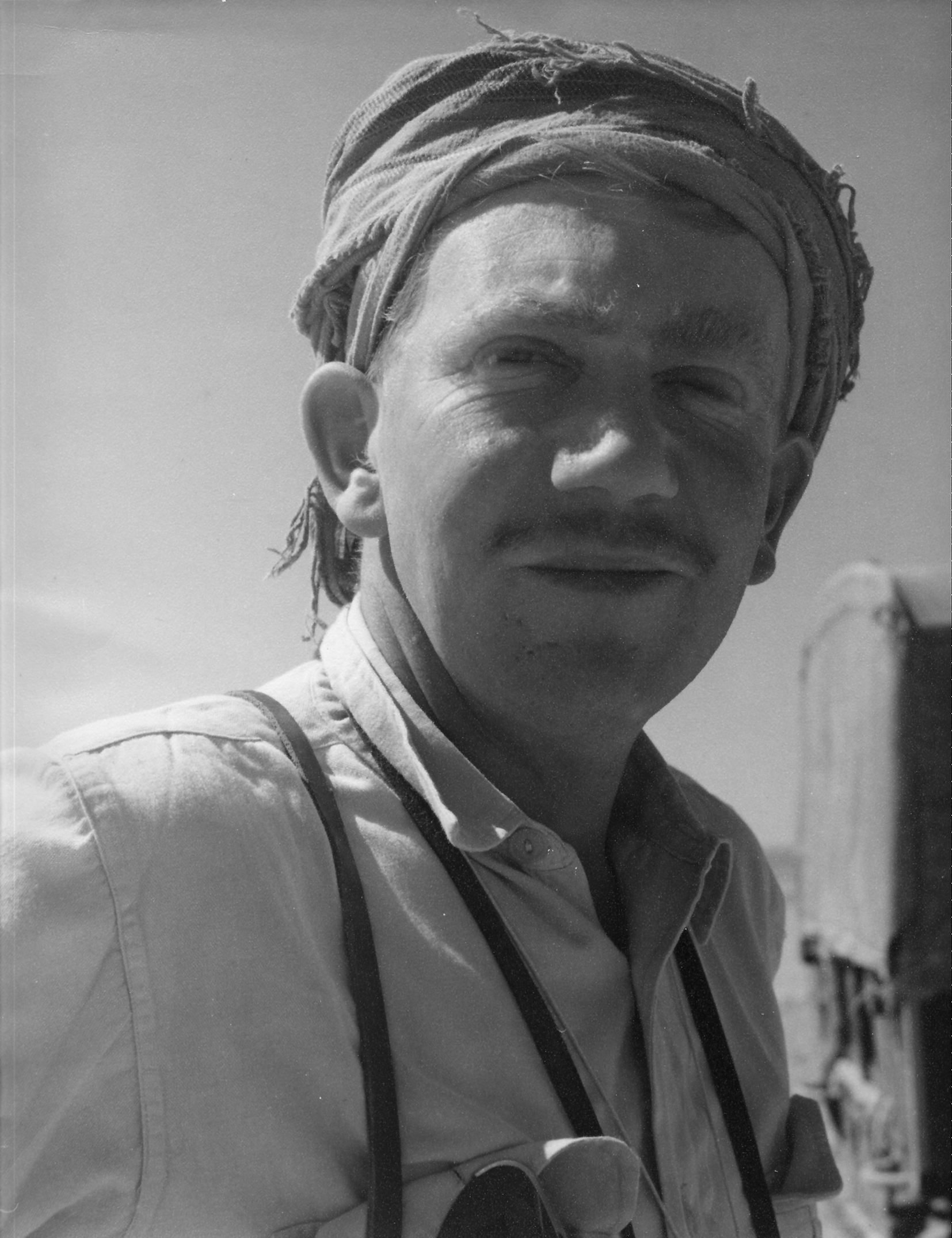
- Born: Douglas Michael Morton; 11 July 1924; Huddersfield, England
- Died: 22 November 2003 (aged 79); Llansantffraid-ym-Mechain, Wales
- Education: Huddersfield Technical College; Leeds University
- Known for: His expertise in the petroleum geology of the Middle East
- Scientific career
- Fields: Geology
- Workplaces: Iraq Petroleum Company, Canadian Industrial Gas & Oil Ltd, Marathon Oil Corporation, Hunt Oil, World Bank

Douglas Michael "Mike" Morton (11 July 1924 – 22 November 2003) was a British petroleum geologist and an authority on the geology of the Middle East.

Between 1947 and 1953, Morton and fellow geologist René Wetzel worked together in Iraq for the Iraq Petroleum Company (IPC), carrying out extensive fieldwork and mapping the Mesozoic outcrops. This work was later incorporated in the Stratigraphic Lexicon of Iraq which remains a key reference.

Pre-war geological investigations in Iraq had been suspended as a result of civil disturbances, and were not resumed until 1946 when 'a planned campaign of stratigraphic research was set afoot'. Under the overall charge of F.R.S. Henson, the project involved a vast amount of fieldwork and laboratory studies. René Wetzel directed most of the work in Kurdistan, the Sinjar and the western desert, assisted by Morton and other geologists such as Dr R.G.S. ('Doc') Hudson, Charles André, Harold Dunnington and Henry Hotchkiss over a period of six years. Deeper wells were drilled to locate older deposits: this resulted in oil being discovered in the Middle Cretaceous at Ain Zalah, Kirkuk and Bai Hasan.

In 1952, Morton and his colleagues discovered the articulated anterior half of an ichthyosaur (lacking the rostrum) at Chia Gara, Armadia, in Kurdistan, which was transported to the Natural History Museum in London. Of the species type Melawania anachronus, it was a significant find, being much more primitive than other Cretaceous ichthyosaurs and only the second ichthyosaur to be reported from the Middle East.

Morton held various exploration posts in the Middle East, covering Syria, Jordan, Yemen, Oman, Qatar and Abu Dhabi. From February 1954 to April 1957, he led a geological field party to central Oman for Petroleum Development Oman, which was then a subsidiary of IPC. In October 1954, the party accessed and began surveying Jebel Fahud and its surrounding area for the first time. In 1957, Morton was appointed IPC's Senior Geologist, Persian Gulf.

In 1959, he attended the 5th World Petroleum Congress and delivered a paper entitled The Geology of Oman which became a standard reference for those studying the geology of Arabia. This was described by the Chief Geologist of IPC, N.E. Baker, as "a major contribution to the geology of southern Arabia, ranking along with Lees' (George Martin Lees) early work on the geology of Oman."

Morton's paper referenced one of the most intriguing aspects of the geology of Oman: how oceanic crust, known as the Semail Ophiolite, came to occur all around the Hajar Mountains and Jebel Akhdar, the "Green Mountain". The theory supported by Morton and others – Tschopp (1967) and Wilson (1969) – was that these igneous rocks had essentially flowed into position. Lees (1928) had earlier proposed a huge thrust sheet, the Semail Nappe, based on his observations in the Oman Mountains, and on his knowledge of the Alps and of the Zagros Mountains. As evidence of plate tectonics grew, a development of Lees' theory (Glennie (1974) emerged. This postulated that, as the continents moved together, a slab of ocean crust from the ancient Tethys Ocean had been pushed over the continental margin for hundreds of kilometres about 87–76 million years ago. However, a leading proponent of the 'in-situ' theory, Hugh Wilson, observed that the major displacement surfaces were not prominent in the field and that he had seen more evidence of extension than compression in the Oman Mountains. Glennie (2001) remains a spirited critique of most of Wilson’s arguments. Almost all later authors interpret the Semail Ophiolite as thrust, or obducted, probably due to a short period of subduction close to the margin of the Arabian plate.

In 1971, after retiring from IPC, Morton was appointed deputy leader of the Royal Geographical Society (RGS) expedition to the Musandam Peninsula in Oman. This followed the lifting of a 50-year ban on foreigners being allowed to visit the area on account of tribal sensitivities. The expedition, led by Norman Falcon FRS, formerly Chief Geologist with BP, was regarded as one of the Society's most successful in recent times, although Falcon admitted that the terrain had made research difficult. The party included geologists, biologists, archaeologists, ethnographers and surveyors resulting in the publication of several important papers about the region.

His pioneering work in Oman, and that of his colleague, Don Sheridan, was commemorated in 2010 by the naming of fossils, Desmochitina mortoni and Euconochitina sheridani. Draconisella mortoni sp. nov., a Mizzia-like Dasycladalean alga from the Lower Cretaceous of Oman, was also named after him.

== Publications ==
- Hudson R. G. S., McGuigan A., Morton D. M. (1954), "The Structure of the Jebel Hagab area, Trucial Oman", Quarterly Journal of the Geological Society, London (1954) 110:121–152.
- Morton, D.M. and Wetzel, R., "Expedition to Southern Arabia", IPC magazine, Vol. 5, Nos. 1–4, August—November 1955.
- Wetzel, R. and Morton, D. M. 1959, "Contributions à la Géologie de la Transjordanie" (1959), Mém. Moyen-Orient T. VII; pp. 95–191.
- Bellen R.C. van, Dunnington H.V., R. Wetzel, and Morton D.M., Stratigraphic Lexicon of Iraq (France: 1959).
- Morton, D.M., "The Geology of Oman", 5th World Petroleum Congress, New York (1959).

== Additional Reading ==
- Morton, M.Q., 2006, In the Heart of the Desert, The Story of an Exploration Geologist and the Search for Oil in the Middle East.
