= Robert Appleby (palaeontologist) =

British paleontologist

- Born: 8 April 1922; Denton, England
- Died: 8 February 2004 (aged 81); Grimsby, England
- Scientific career
- Fields: Paleontology

Robert Milson Appleby (28 April 1922, in Denton – 8 February 2004, in Grimsby) was a British palaeontologist. Appleby developed the Analogue Video Reshaper, which was used to compare the anatomical structure of fossilised Ichthyosaurs as well as match fingerprints in criminal investigations.
