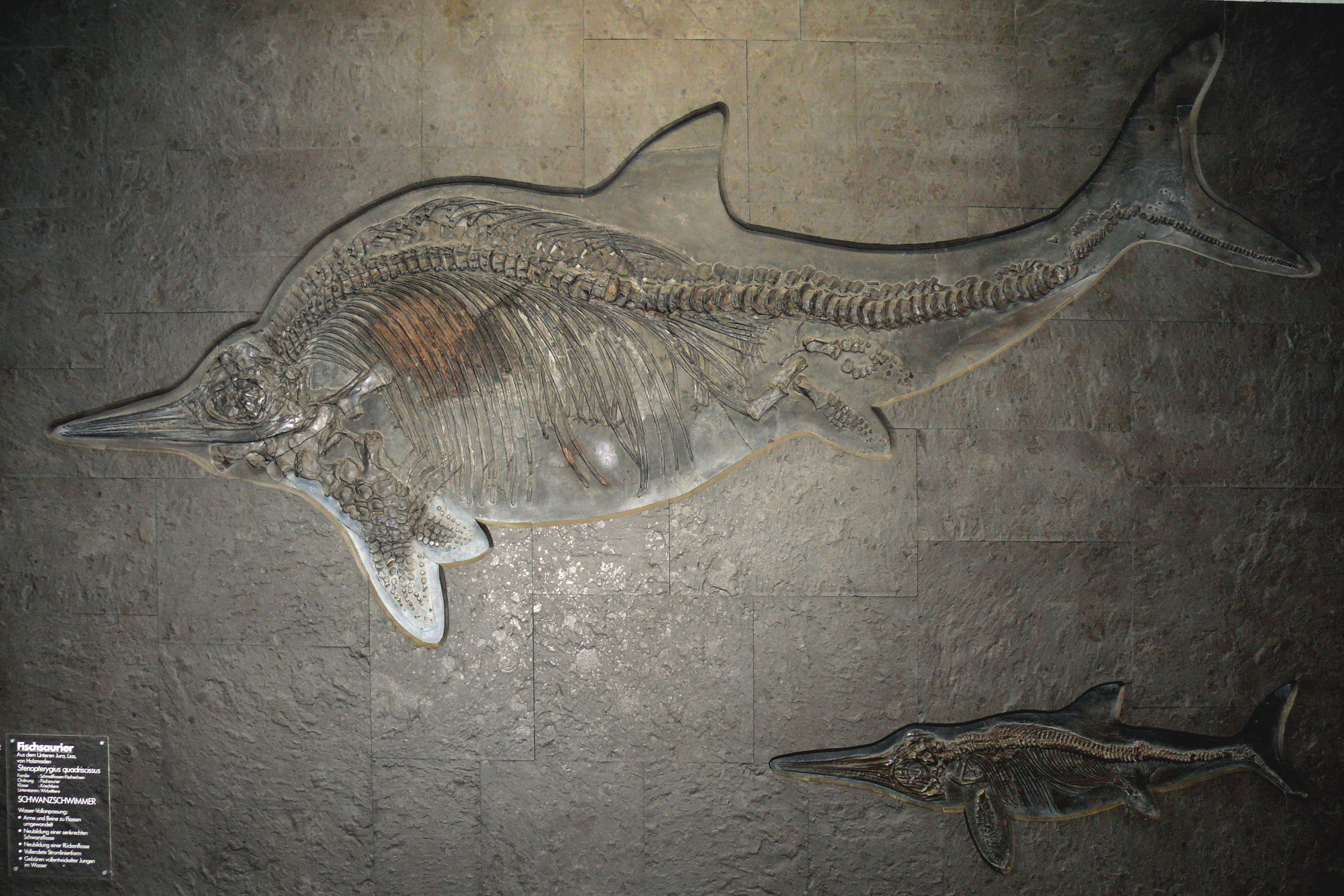
- S. quadriscissus adult and juvenile

Scientific classification
- Kingdom: Animalia
- Phylum: Chordata
- Class: Reptilia
- Order: †Ichthyosauria
- Family: †Stenopterygiidae
- Genus: †Stenopterygius; Jaekel, 1904

Type species
- Ichthyosaurus quadriscissus Quenstedt, 1856

Other Species
- †S. triscissus Quenstedt, 1856 [originally Ichthyosaurus]; †S. longipes Wurstemberger, 1876; †S. aaleniensis Maxwell et al., 2012

Synonyms
- List of synonyms: S. quadriscissus; †Ichthyosaurus quadriscissus Quenstedt, 1856; †Stenopterygius eos; †Stenopterygius incessus; †Stenopterygius macrophasma von Huene, 1922; †Stenopterygius hauffianus Jaekel, 1904 (Partim); †Magnipterygius huenei Maisch & Matzke, 2022; S. triscissus; Ichthyosaurus triscissus Quenstedt, 1856; †Stenopterygius longifrons Owen, 1881; †Stenopterygius megacephalus von Huene, 1922; †Stenopterygius megalorhinus von Huene, 1922; S. longipes; †Stenopterygius uniter Huene, 1931; †Stenopterygius megalorhinus von Huene, 1922 (Partim); †Stenopterygius cuneiceps McGowan, 1979

= Stenopterygius =

Stenopterygius Temporal range: Toarcian-Aalenian ~183–173 Ma

Extinct genus of reptiles

Stenopterygius is an extinct genus of thunnosaur ichthyosaur known from Europe (England, France, Germany, Luxembourg and Switzerland). It was a medium-sized ichthyosaur, with multiple well-preserved specimens, including one which preserved evidence of countershading (similar to most sharks), blubber and a raised, homeothermic metabolism. as well as a female specimen that died in childbirth that showed that the genus preferred tail-first births similar to modern cetaceans.

== History ==
Stenopterygius was originally named by Quenstedt in 1856 as a species of Ichthyosaurus, I. quadriscissus. Otto Jaekel in 1904 reassigned it to its own genus, Stenopterygius. The type species is therefore Ichthyosaurus quadriscissus but the combinatio nova Stenopterygius quadriscissus. The generic name is derived from stenos, Greek for "narrow", and pteryx (πτερυξ), Greek for "fin" or "wing". The specific name means "split in four" referring to the presumed condition of the first finger.

== Description ==
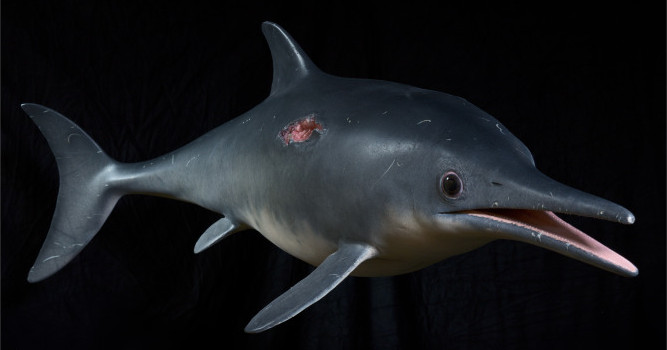
Life restoration of a juvenile Stenopterygius sp.

Stenopterygius was a medium-sized ichthyosaur, with S. quadriscissus and S. triscissus reaching a maximum length of about 3.5 metres (11 ft), with S. aaleniensis being of similar size, while the larger S. uniter could exceed 4 metres (13 ft). Young adults reached at least 2 m (6.6 ft) long, as indicated by the type specimen of S. triscissus measuring 2.2 m (7.2 ft) long. This genus was physically similar to the better known Ichthyosaurus, but had a smaller skull and narrower flippers. Beautifully preserved fossils of Stenopterygius have been found in Germany. Its skull was extended into a kind of a beak and was armed with a quantity of large teeth. The limbs had been transformed to fin-like structures. The tail terminated in a large, semicircular, leathery, vertical caudal fin and even a triangular dorsal fin was present. One well-preserved fossil of Stenopterygius preserves traces of skin, from which the animal's coloration was discovered to be countershaded (darker on the back than the underbelly).

== Classification ==
Most of the more than 100 known specimens of Stenopterygius were redescribed by Michael W. Maisch in 2008. He found that S. quadriscissus (the combinatio nova of the type species Ichthyosaurus quadriscissus) also includes S. eos, S. incessus, and S. macrophasma, as well as specimens previously referred to S. hauffianus and S. megacephalus. Maisch followed Woodward (1932) and considered Ichthyosaurus triscissus to be a valid species of Stenopterygius. The type specimens of S. longifrons, S. megacephalus, and S. megalorhinus were all referred to this species, as the name I. triscissus has a priority over them. Some specimens previously referred to S. megalorhinus, as well as the holotype of S. cuneiceps, were found to belong to a species of their own for which the binomen Stenopterygius uniter can be used.

As the holotype of S. uniter was destroyed in World War II, Maisch proposed a neotype. Maisch also found that S. promegacephalus is a nomen dubium, as it is based on a juvenile specimen, and that the lectotype of S. hauffianus can be determined as Stenopterygius cf. S. quadriscissus at best, so this species should be considered a nomen dubium. He found out that most specimens previously referred to S. hauffianus can be referred to S. quadriscissus, while the rest belongs to a highly distinctive new taxon that cannot be referred to any valid species of Stenopterygius. This species was reassigned to its own genus, Hauffiopteryx.

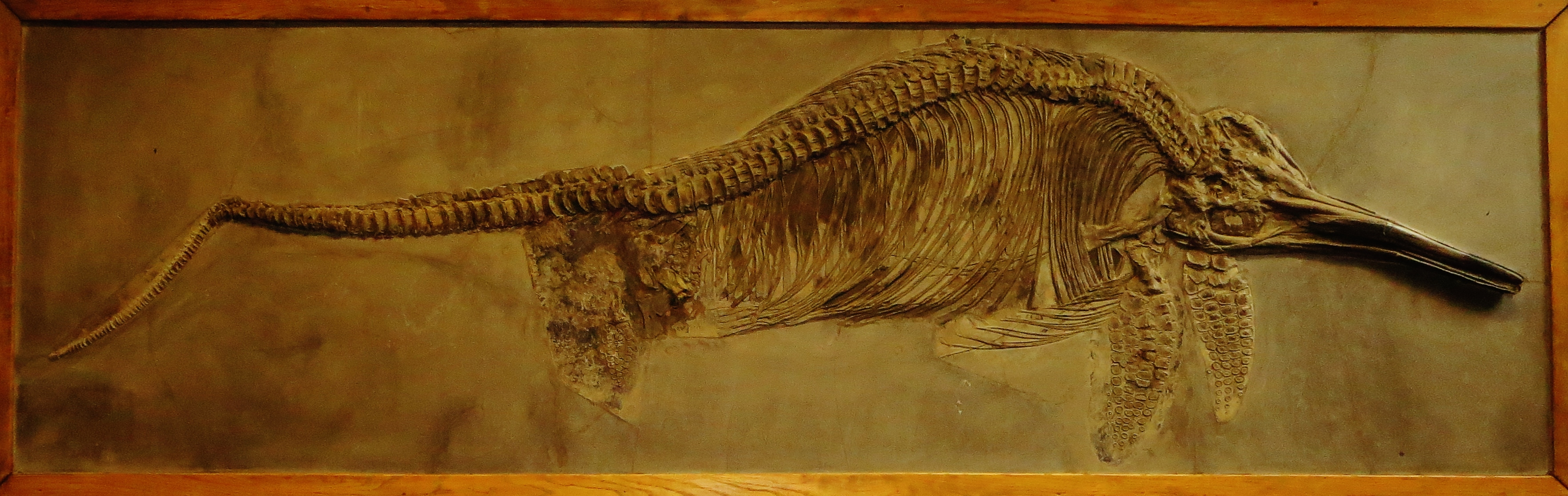
S. triscissus specimen

Stenopterygius is known from the lectotype GPIT 43/0219-1 (also registered as GPIT-PV-30028 and PV 7532), a complete, articulated skeleton which preserved a very large embryo. The animal is about 3.15 m (10.3 ft) in length. It was collected from the Harpoceras elegantulum-exaratum ammonoid subzones (more specifically Lias ε II3-4), Harpoceras falcifer zone, of the famous Posidonien-Schiefer lagerstätte (Posidonia Shale) of Holzmaden, dating to the early Toarcian stage of the Early Jurassic, about 182 million years ago. Maisch referred to the type species 30 additional specimens, all came from Dobbertin of Mecklenburg-Vorpommern and Holzmaden, Germany and Dudelange, Luxembourg. They were collected from the Harpoceras palum to H. falciferum ammonoid subzones (Lias ε I2-II11, lower-middle early Toarcian), Harpoceras tenuicostatum-falcifer zones, of the Posidonia Shale. S. triscissus is known from the holotype GPIT 12/0224-2, articulated almost complete skeleton. The animal is a young adult about 2.2 m (7.2 ft) in length. It was collected from the Harpoceras exaratum-elegans ammonoid subzones (more specifically Lias ε II6), Harpoceras falcifer zone, of the Posidonia Shale in Ohmden, dating to the middle Early Toarcian stage of the Early Jurassic. Maisch referred to this species 13 additional specimens, all came from various localities in England, France, Germany, Luxembourg and Switzerland. They were collected from the Lias ε II1-III, dating to the middle-late Early Toarcian.

S. uniter is known from the holotype SMNS 14216, articulated complete skeleton which was destroyed in World War II. The animal is an adult about 3.35 m (11.0 ft) in length. The proposed neotype is GPIT 1491/10, articulated almost complete skeleton. The animal is a young adult about 2.34 m (7.7 ft) in length. It was collected from the Harpoceras falcifer ammonoid subzones (more specifically Lias ε II10), Harpoceras falcifer zone, of the Posidonia Shale in Holzmaden, dating to the middle Early Toarcian stage of the Early Jurassic. Maisch referred to this species 10 additional specimens, all came from Holzmaden. They were collected from the Harpoceras exaratum to H. falciferum ammonoid subzones (Lias ε II6-II11, middle early Toarcian), Harpoceras falcifer zones, of the Posidonia Shale.

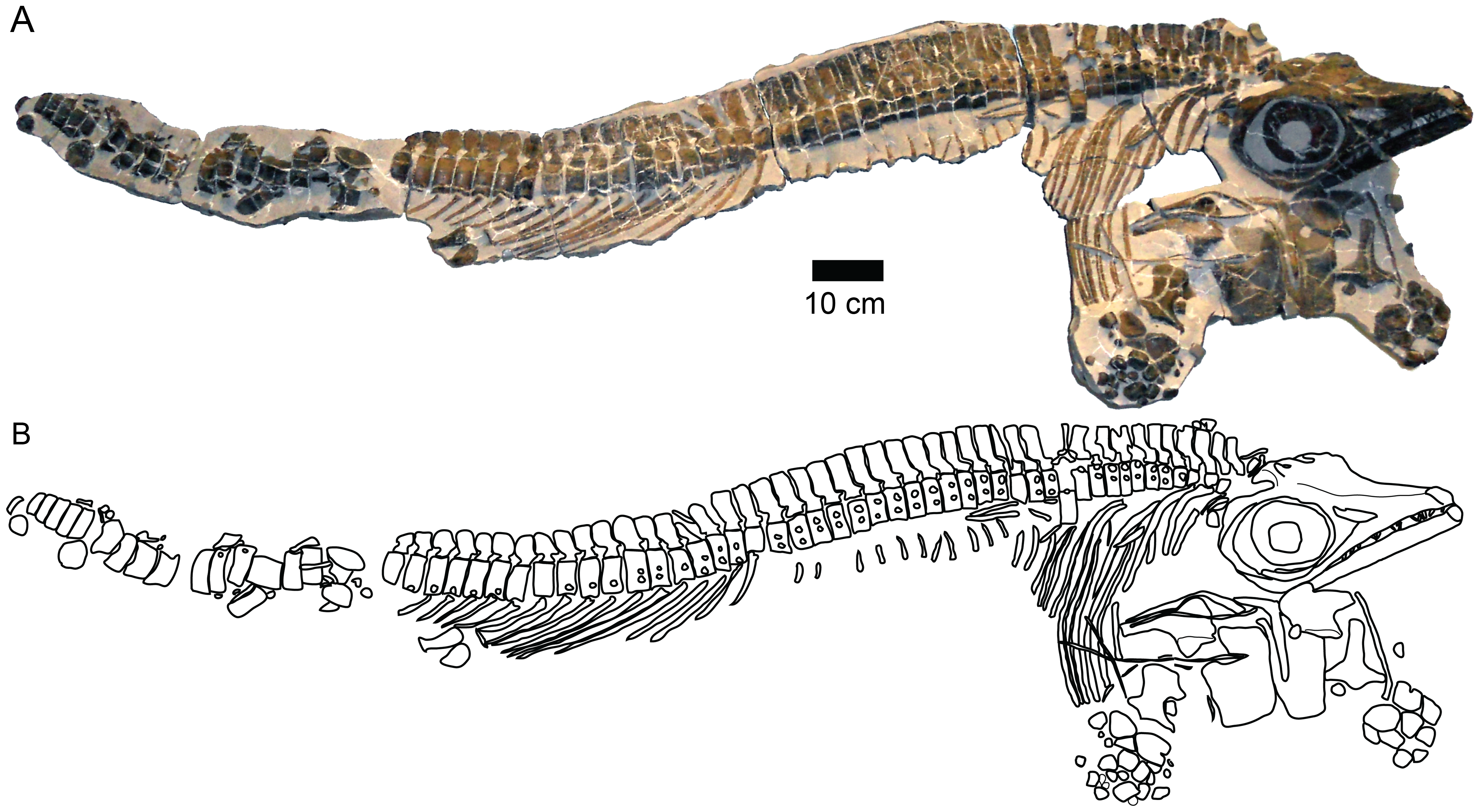
S. aaleniensis holotype

Additional materials were described by Hannah Caine and Michael J. Benton in 2011, from the early Toarcian Beacon Limestone of Strawberry Bank, Ilminster of England. The specimens are all juveniles or infants, which were preserved mostly by almost complete skeletons and some skulls. They include BRLSI M1405, BRLSI M1407, BRLSI M1408, BRLSI M1409. Caine and Benton referred these specimens to S. triscissus.

A Middle Jurassic species from southwestern Germany, Stenopterygius aaleniensis, was described in 2012.

Maisch and Matzke (2000) and Maisch (2010) regarded Chacaicosaurus and Hauffiopteryx to be stenopterygiids. However, they didn't perform any cladistic analyses to confirm these claims. Fischer et al. (2011) performed a cladistic analysis that found Chacaicosaurus to be a basal thunnosaur which is placed outside both Stenopterygiidae and Ophthalmosauridae. Both Maisch (2008) and Caine and Benton (2011) performed cladistic analyses that found Hauffiopteryx to be either a basalmost member of Eurhinosauria or a basalmost member of Thunnosauria (which is an equivalent position to a basalmost member of Stenopterygiidae sensu Maisch [2008] with exclusion of Ichthyosaurus). These results mean that the Stenopterygiidae are a monotypic family that includes only the type genus Stenopterygius.

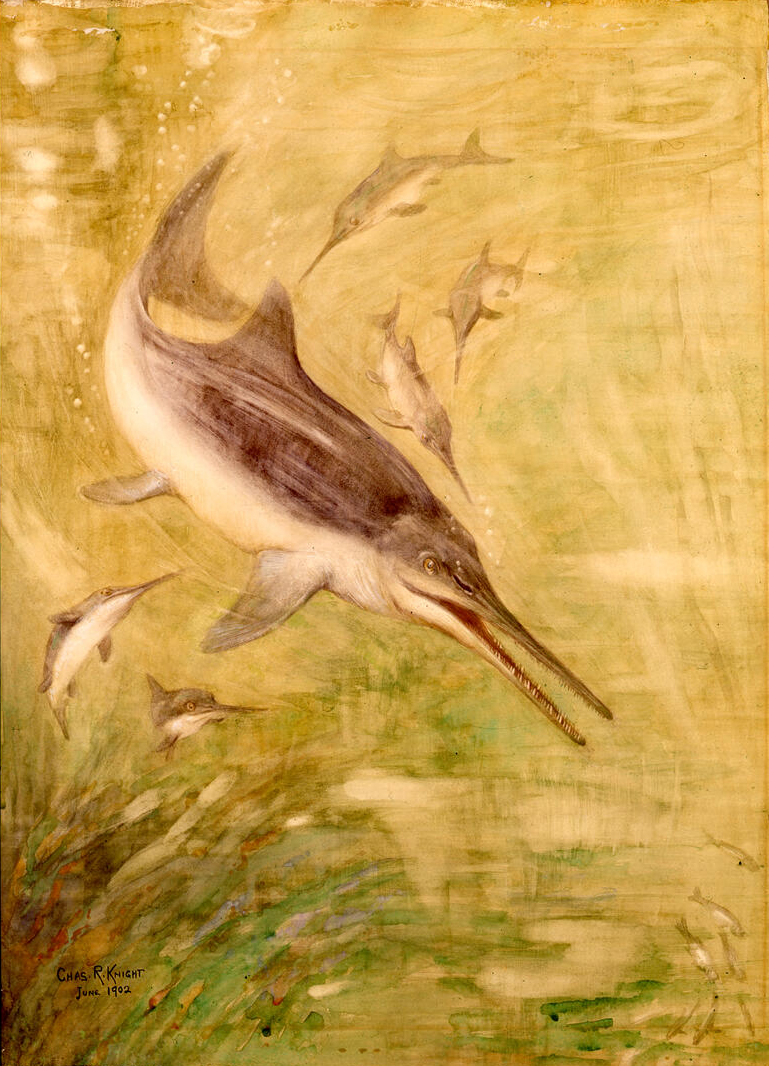
1906 restoration by Charles R. Knight

The cladogram below follows the topology from a 2010 analysis by Patrick S. Druckenmiller and Erin E. Maxwell.

- Thunnosauria
  - Ichthyosaurus
  - - Stenopterygius
    - - "Ophthalmosaurus" natans
      - Ophthalmosauridae
        - - Aegirosaurus
          - Ophthalmosaurus (type species)
        - - Mollesaurus
          - - Athabascasaurus
            - - Brachypterygius
              - - Arthropterygius
                - Caypullisaurus
                - "Platypterygius" hercynicus
                - "Platypterygius" australis (=Longirostria)
                - Platypterygius (type species)
                - - Maiaspondylus
                  - "Platypterygius" americanus (=Tenuirostria)

A 2026 study, which analyzed fossils from the Early Jurassic (Toarcian) Whitby Mudstone Formation interpreted S. uniter as a junior synonym of S. longipes and interpreting Magnipterygius huenei as a junior synonym of S. quadriscissus.

== Palaeobiology ==
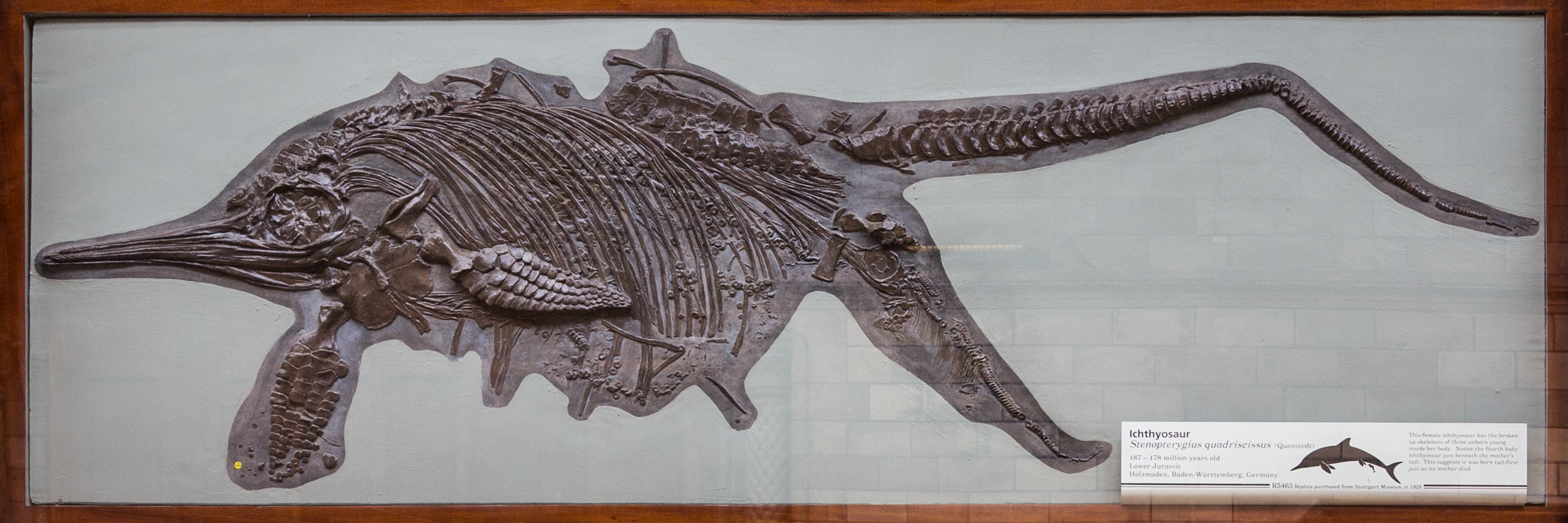
Cast of a specimen (NHMUK PV R5463) in which an embryo was pushed out of the body post mortem, on display at the Natural History Museum, London

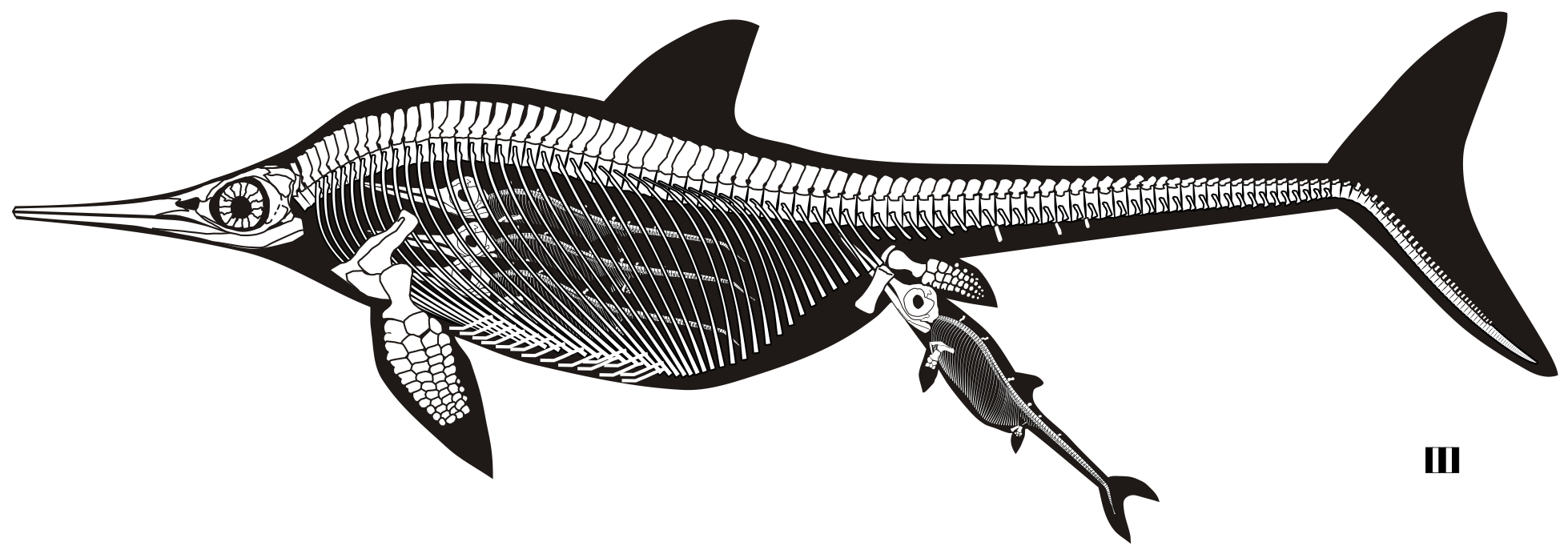
Skeletal restoration of an adult with juveniles

The habits of Stenopterygius spp. were similar to those of present-day dolphins. They spent most of their lives in the open sea, where they hunted fish, cephalopods, and other animals. The abdominal cavities of skeletons of this ichthyosaur often contain the remains of such food.

One famous fossil is that of a mother and baby that died in childbirth (ichthyosaurs were viviparous). Stenopterygius had a preference for tail-first birth, like modern day cetaceans. However, there are specimens known with fetuses in utero suggesting a head-first birth.

In 2018, a Stenopterygius specimen was reported with evidence of having had blubber, which indicates that other ichthyosaurs and it were homeothermic ("warm blooded"). The same specimen also suggests that ichthyosaurs would have been countershaded, on the basis of distributional variation of melanophores that contain eumelanin.

== See also ==
- List of ichthyosaurs
- Timeline of ichthyosaur research
