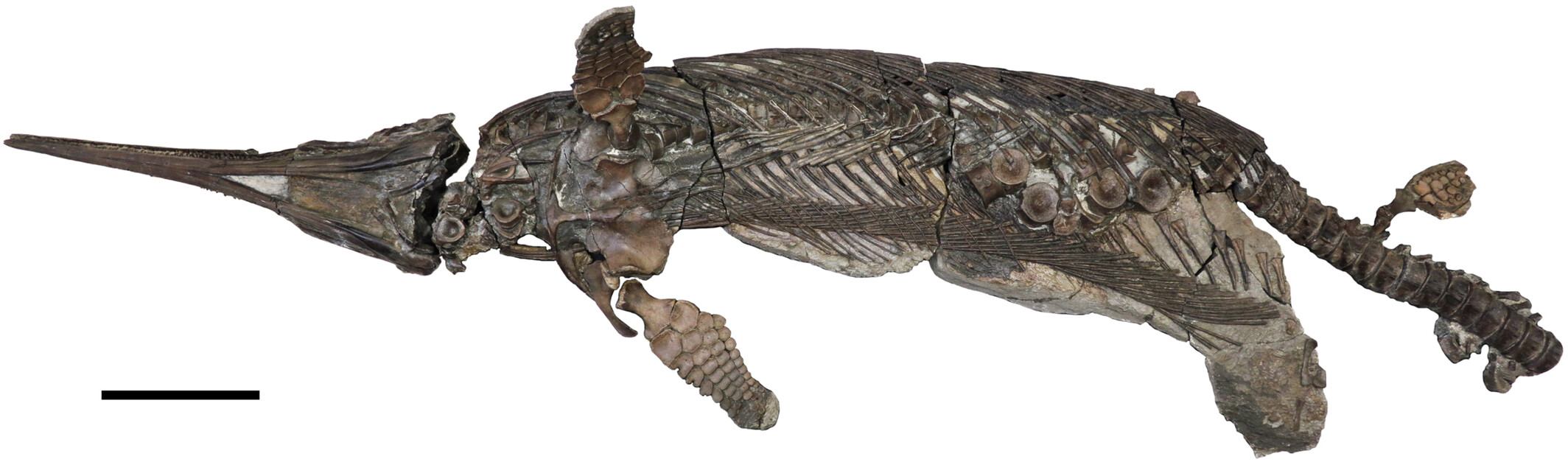
- Holotype skeleton and skull

Scientific classification
- Kingdom: Animalia
- Phylum: Chordata
- Class: Reptilia
- Order: †Ichthyosauria
- Family: †Leptonectidae
- Clade: †Hauffiopterygia
- Genus: †Xiphodracon; Lomax, Massare & Maxwell, 2025
- Species: †X. goldencapensis

Binomial name
- †Xiphodracon goldencapensis Lomax, Massare & Maxwell, 2025

= Xiphodracon =

Xiphodracon Temporal range: Early Jurassic, Pliensbachian

Genus of ichthyosaurs

Xiphodracon (lit. 'sword-like dragon') is an extinct genus of leptonectid ichthyosaurian known from the Early Jurassic (Pliensbachian age) Charmouth Mudstone Formation (Lias Group) of the United Kingdom. The genus contains a single species, Xiphodracon goldencapensis, known from a nearly complete skull and skeleton. This specimen represents the most complete ichthyosaur known from the Pliensbachian age. Xiphodracon is a close relative of Hauffiopteryx within the clade Hauffiopterygia.

== Discovery and naming ==
The Xiphodracon holotype specimen, ROM VP52596, was discovered by Chris Moore in 2001 in outcrops of the Charmouth Mudstone Formation (Green Ammonite Member) near Golden Cap, part of the English 'Jurassic Coast' between Charmouth and Seatown in Dorset. After initially preparing the specimen, Moore sold it to the Royal Ontario Museum in Toronto, Canada, where preparation was finished. It is now permanently accessioned at this museum as specimen ROM VP52596. The specimen consists of an almost complete, articulated skeleton and skull preserved three-dimensionally, missing only one of the hindlimbs and the end of the tail. A cast of the specimen is housed at the State Museum of Natural History Stuttgart in Germany.

In 2025, Dean R. Lomax, Judy A. Massare, and Erin E. Maxwell described Xiphodracon goldencapensis as a new genus and species of ichthyosaurs based on these fossil remains. The generic name, Xiphodracon, combines the Ancient Greek words xiphos, meaning "sword" and drakōn, meaning "dragon". This references the long, narrow snout of the animal and the informal historical usage of the term 'sea dragon' in reference to ichthyosaurs. The specific name, goldencapensis, refers to the discovery of the holotype at Golden Cap. The intended meaning of the full binomial name is "sword-like dragon from Golden Cap".

The Xiphodracon holotype represents the most complete skeleton of an ichthyosaur found in rock layers of the Pliensbachian age of the Early Jurassic. It is the twelfth named Early Jurassic ichthyosaur genus, and the sixth from this specific age (alongside Ichthyosaurus, Fernatator, Temnodontosaurus, and the more closely related Leptonectes and Hauffiopteryx).

== Description ==
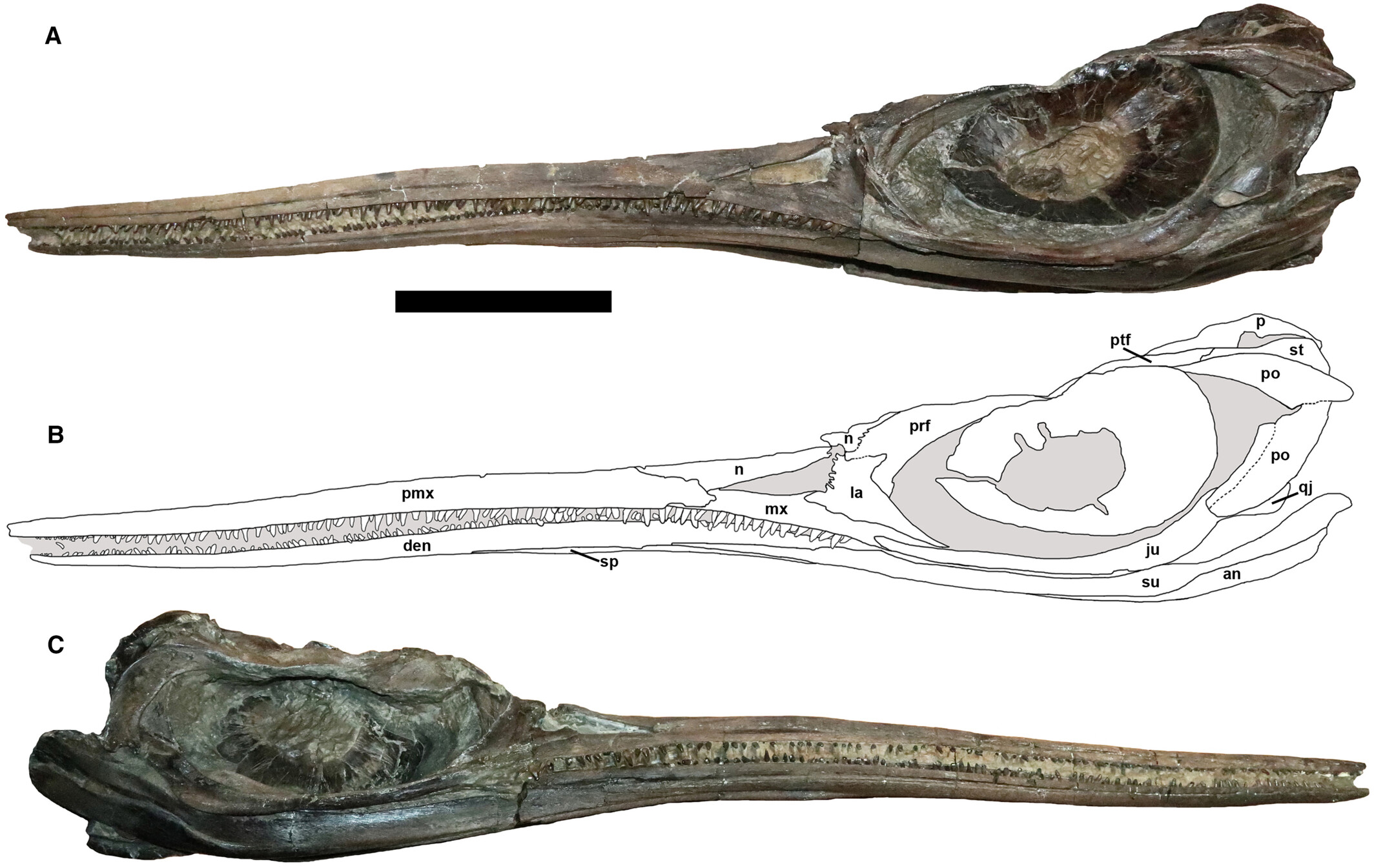
Holotype skull

The holotype of Xiphodracon belongs to an individual that was around 3 metres (9.8 ft) in life. Based on the presence of fusion between cranial bones, the holotype likely represents an individual that was nearly skeletally mature when it died. The skull measures 64.2 cm (25.3 in) in length, and the rostrum is narrow, slender, and elongate in morphology. The orbit is large, nearly filled with a scleral ring comprising about 17 distinct ossicles.

=== Palaeobiology ===
Stomach contents are preserved in the Xiphodracon holotype, arranged on the left side of the body, supporting the argument that the stomach was positioned here in life. Actinopterygian bones and scales are observable in the stomach contents. The holotype individual suffered some injuries while it was alive, including a fractured clavicle, malformed teeth, and avascular necrosis (bone tissue death due to loss of blood supply) in the upper limb bones. In extant (modern) marine vertebrates, avascular necrosis happens when the animal's normal diving behavior is disrupted by a sympathetic nervous response (i.e., fight-or-flight response). This can occur after the unsuccessful attack of a predator, and is a probable cause of the presence of this condition in the Xiphodracon holotype. This individual likely died after a bite to the skull from a larger predator, based on a fractured and depressed region observed on the skull roof. The only predators known from the same time as Xiphodracon that are large enough to inflict such a bite are large individuals of Temnodontosaurus, another ichthyosaur measuring up to 9 m (30 ft) in total length. To bite the skull in this way, the predator's gape had to be at least 15 centimetres (5.9 in), and to consume an ichthyosaur the size of the Xiphodracon holotype, the gape would have to be more than 40 cm (16 in). A bite mark observed on the right femur of this specimen likely came from scavenging from a smaller animal after the holotype individual's death.

== Classification ==
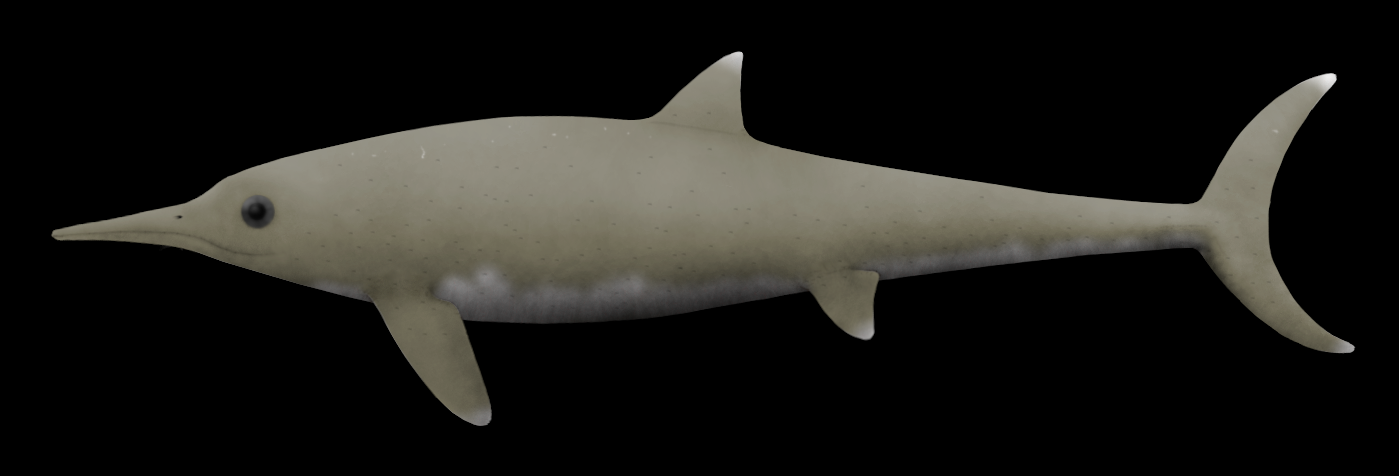
Speculative life restoration of the closely related Hauffiopteryx

In their 2025 phylogenetic analyses, Lomax and colleagues recovered Xiphodracon as the sister taxon to the genus Hauffiopteryx within the broader ichthyosaurian clade Neoichthyosauria. Based on this close relationship, they named the new clade Hauffiopterygia to house both genera. Using extended implied weights parsimony, the Hauffiopterygia was recovered within the family Leptonectidae, which includes the genera Eurhinosaurus, Excalibosaurus, Leptonectes, and Wahlisaurus. Using equal weights parsimony, the Hauffiopterygia were instead recovered in a position diverging immediately after the Leptonectidae. The results of the former analysis, which are preferred by the researchers, are displayed in the cladogram below:

- Neoichthyosauria
  - Temnodontosauridae
  - - Temnodontosaurus azerguensis
    - - Temnodontosaurus crassimanus
      - - Ichthyosauridae
        - - Leptonectidae
            - Wahlisaurus massarae
            - - - Leptonectes moorei
                - - Leptonectes tenuirostris
                  - - Eurhinosaurus longirostris
                    - - Excalibosaurus costini
                      - Leptonectes solei
              - Hauffiopterygia
                - Xiphodracon goldencapensis
                - Hauffiopteryx spp.
          - Baracromia
            - Stenopterygius spp.
            - - Chacaicosaurus cayi
              - Ophthalmosauria
