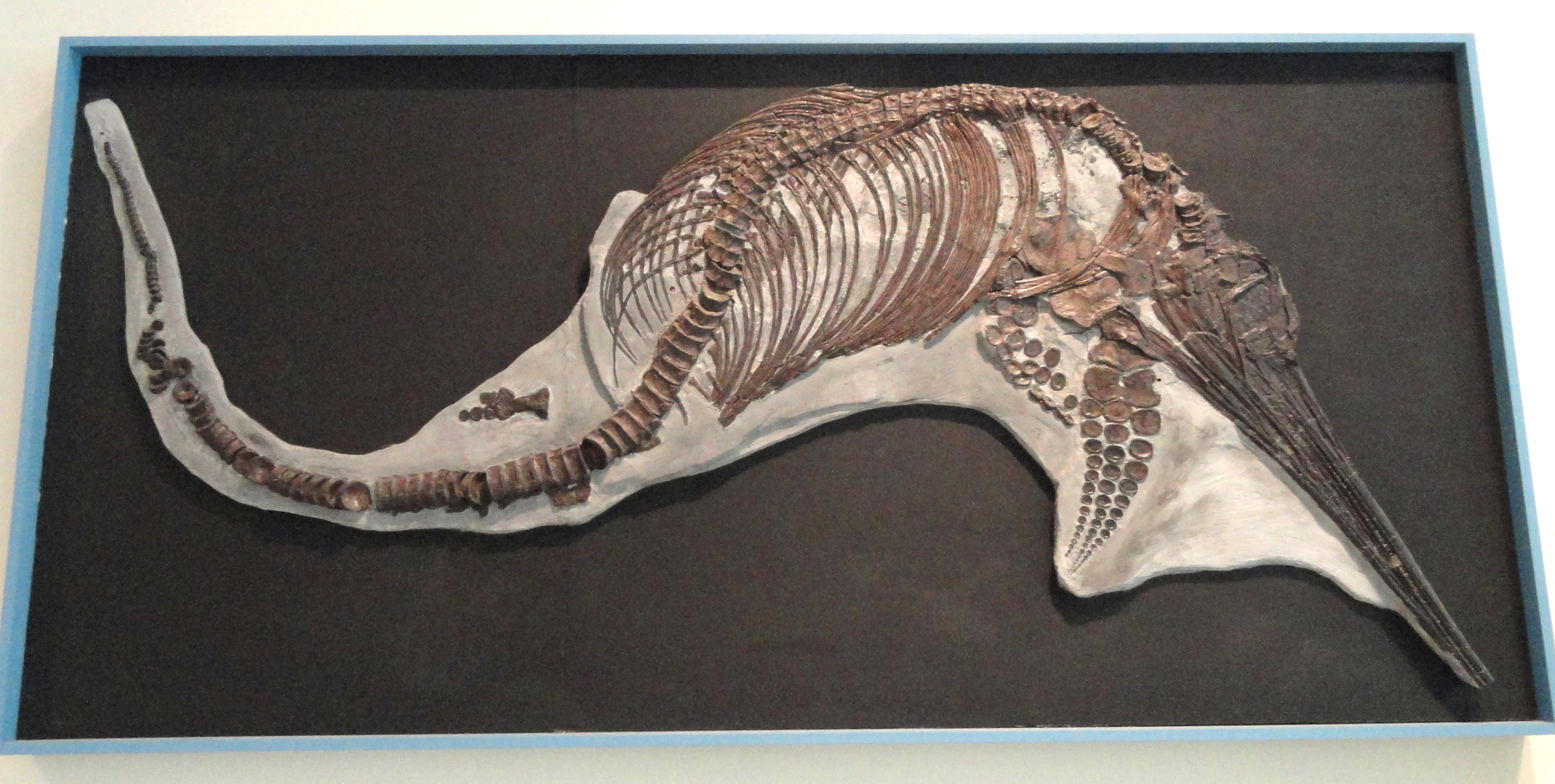
- Skeleton of Leptonectes tenuirostris

Scientific classification
- Kingdom: Animalia
- Phylum: Chordata
- Class: Reptilia
- Order: †Ichthyosauria
- Node: †Neoichthyosauria
- Family: †Leptonectidae; Maisch, 1998

Genera
- †Eurhinosaurus; †Excalibosaurus; †Leptonectes; †Wahlisaurus; †Hauffiopterygia? Lomax, Massare & Maxwell, 2025; †Hauffiopteryx; †Xiphodracon

= Leptonectidae =

Leptonectids Temporal range: Late Triassic–Early Jurassic, Rhaetian–Toarcian

Extinct family of reptiles

Leptonectidae is a family of ichthyosaurs known from Late Triassic to Early Jurassic marine deposits in Europe. They were all small to medium-sized creatures, most noted for their very long, swordfish-like snouts, which could have been used like a weapon, slashing through schools of fish.

== Classification ==
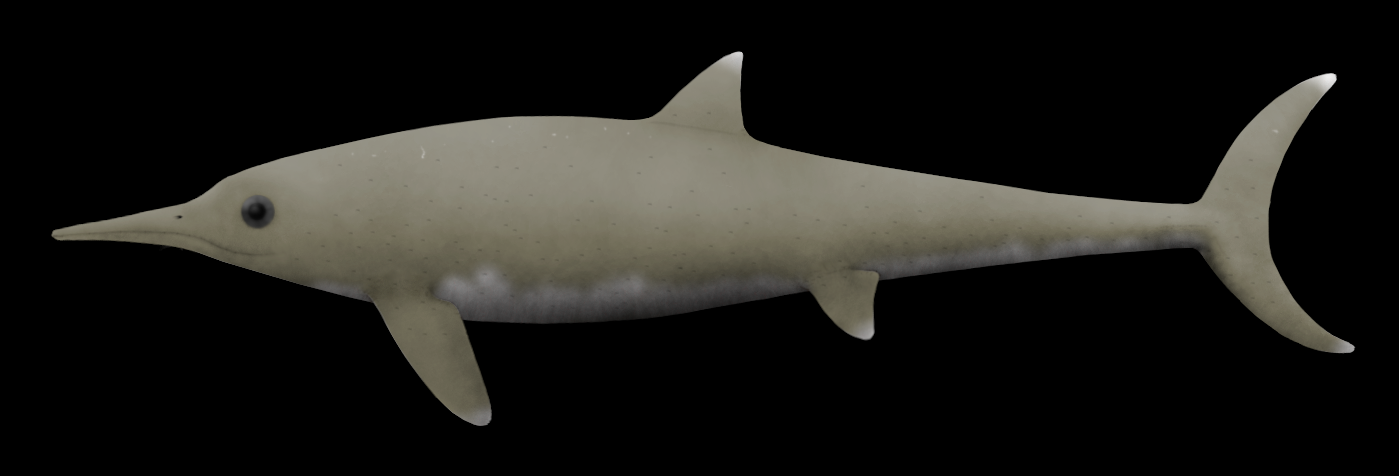
Speculative life restoration of Hauffiopteryx typicus, a possible leptonectid

In their 2025 description of Xiphodracon, Lomax and colleagues recovered this taxon as the sister taxon to the genus Hauffiopteryx within the broader ichthyosaurian clade Neoichthyosauria. Based on this close relationship, they named the new clade Hauffiopterygia to house both genera. Using extended implied weights parsimony, the Hauffiopterygia was recovered within the family Leptonectidae, which comprises the genera Eurhinosaurus, Excalibosaurus, Leptonectes, and Wahlisaurus. Using equal weights parsimony, the Hauffiopterygia was instead recovered in a position diverging immediately after the Leptonectidae. The results of the former analysis, which are preferred by the researchers, are displayed in the cladogram below:

- Neoichthyosauria
  - Temnodontosauridae
  - - Temnodontosaurus azerguensis
    - - Temnodontosaurus crassimanus
      - - Ichthyosauridae
        - - Leptonectidae
            - Wahlisaurus massarae
            - - - Leptonectes moorei
                - - Leptonectes tenuirostris
                  - - Eurhinosaurus longirostris
                    - - Excalibosaurus costini
                      - Leptonectes solei
              - Hauffiopterygia
                - Xiphodracon goldencapensis
                - Hauffiopteryx spp.
          - Baracromia
            - Stenopterygius spp.
            - - Chacaicosaurus cayi
              - Ophthalmosauria
