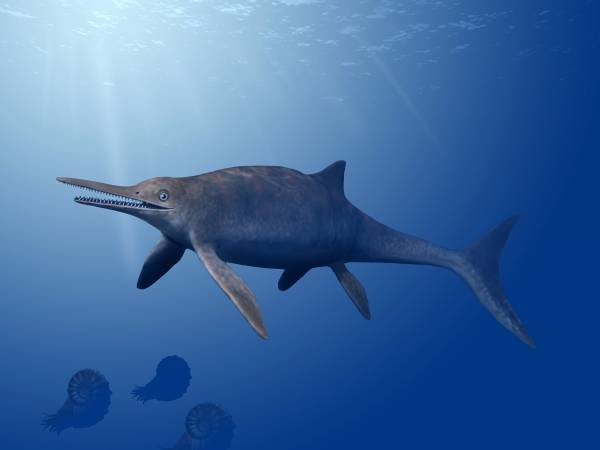
- Life reconstruction of the Wahlisaurus massarae holotype individual

Scientific classification
- Kingdom: Animalia
- Phylum: Chordata
- Class: Reptilia
- Order: †Ichthyosauria
- Family: †Leptonectidae
- Genus: †Wahlisaurus; Lomax, 2016

Type species
- †Wahlisaurus massarae Lomax, 2016

= Wahlisaurus =

Wahlisaurus Temporal range: Early Jurassic, Hettangian

Extinct genus of reptiles

Wahlisaurus is an extinct genus of leptonectid ichthyosaur from the Scunthorpe Mudstone of England. The type species is Wahlisaurus massarae, and two specimens have been found: the first consisting of a skull and an incomplete skeleton, and the second a single coracoid.

== Discovery ==
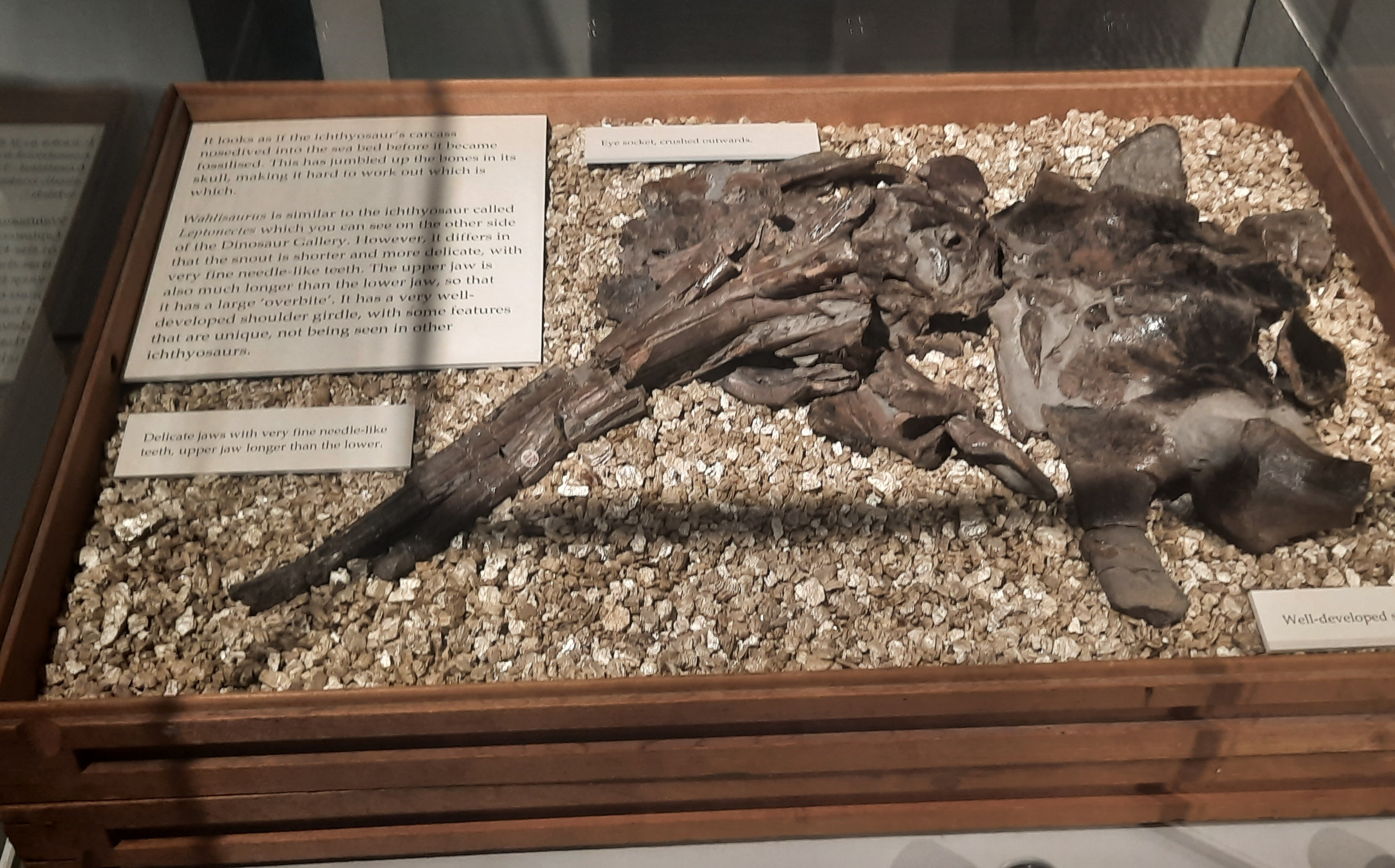
Wahlisaurus massarae holotype

The holotype specimen, LEICT G454.1951.5, was discovered in the Scunthorpe Mudstone, Barrow upon Soar, Nottinghamshire by Percy Faulkes, and it was donated to the New Walk Museum in Leicester when he died in 1951. Parts of the specimen were then sent on loan to Robert Appleby until he died in 2004, and they were subsequently returned to the Museum.

In 2016, Dean Lomax named and described Wahlisaurus massarae.

The second specimen was found in 1996 and identified as belonging to Wahlisaurus massarae in 2018 in the private collection of Simon Carpenter, who donated the specimen to the Bristol Museum and Art Gallery.

== Description ==
Wahlisaurus shares features, such as a slender and long snout, with other leptonectids of that time (e.g. Eurhinosaurus, Excalibosaurus, etc.). The extent of the overbite is less than that of Eurhinosaurus. Differences can be found in Wahlisaurus' shoulder girdle. Both the coracoid and the contact between the coracoid and the scapula possess a foramen.

== Etymology ==
LEICT G454.1951.5 was named in honour of William Wahl and Professor Judy Massare, both specialists in mesozoic marine reptiles who mentored Lomax.
