= Scunthorpe Mudstone =

Geological formation in England

- Stratigraphic range: Rhaetian-Hettangian; ~205–196.5 Ma
- Type: Formation
- Unit of: Lias Group
- Sub-units: Barnstone Member
- Underlies: Charmouth Mudstone Formation
- Overlies: Lilstock Formation
- Thickness: Up to 128 m

Lithology
- Primary: Mudstone
- Other: Limestone, Siltstone

Location
- Coordinates: 52.9°N 1.0°W
- Approximate paleocoordinates: 38.0°N 1.3°E
- Region: England
- Country: United Kingdom
- Extent: East Midlands Shelf Leicester to Market Weighton

Type section
- Named for: Scunthorpe
- Location: Blyborough Borehole, Blyborough, Lincolnshire
- Scunthorpe Mudstone (the United Kingdom) Scunthorpe Mudstone (England)

The Scunthorpe Mudstone is a geologic formation in England. It preserves plesiosaur fossils dating back to the Late Triassic (Rhaetian) to Early Jurassic (Hettangian) period. It predominantly consists of grey mudstone with thin beds of argillaceous limestone and calcareous siltstone. The Ichthyosaur Wahlisaurus and the holotype specimen of the dinosaur Sarcosaurus. are known from the formation

== See also ==
- List of fossiliferous stratigraphic units in England
