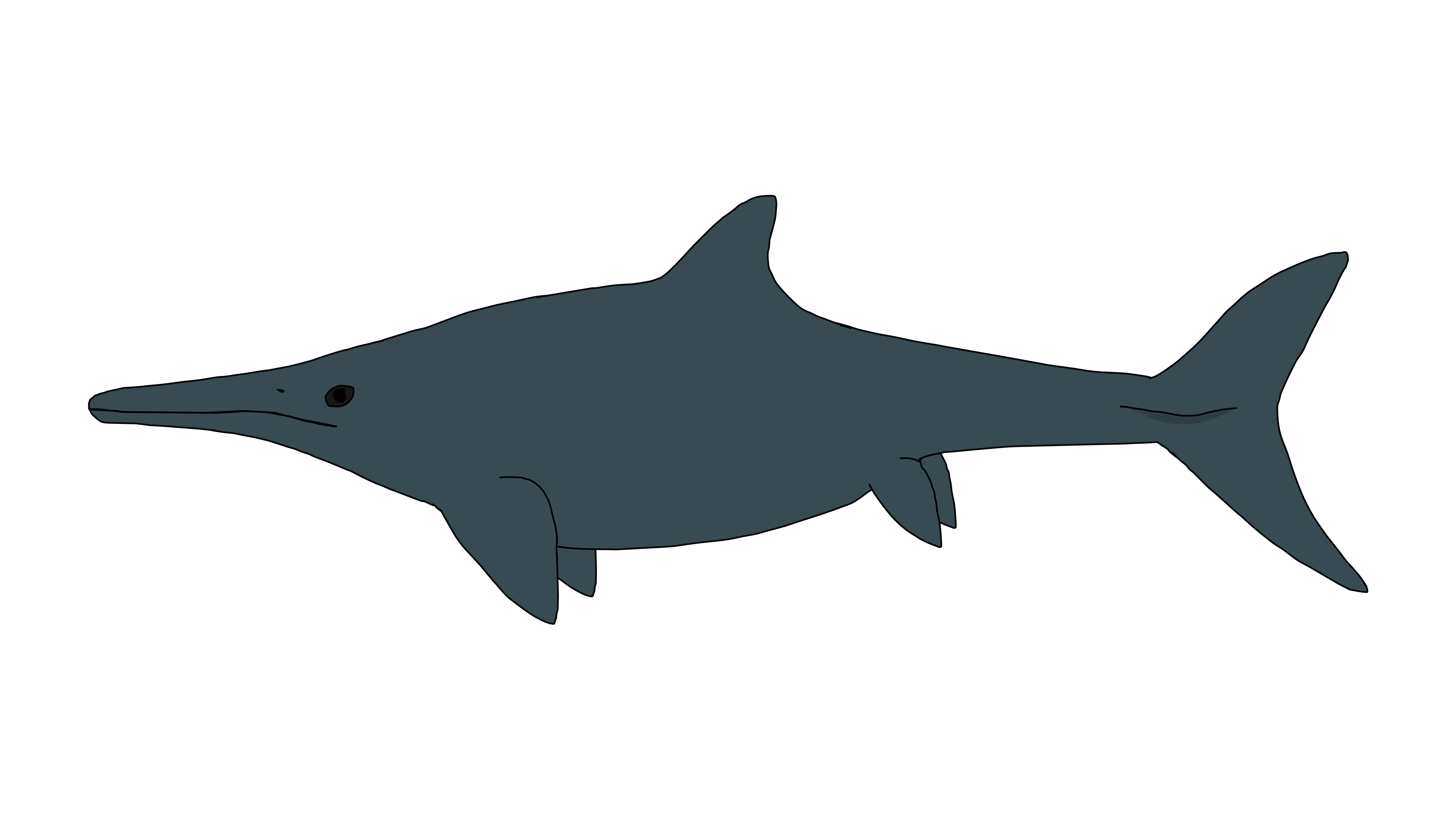

Scientific classification
- Kingdom: Animalia
- Phylum: Chordata
- Class: Reptilia
- Order: †Ichthyosauria
- Family: †Stenopterygiidae
- Genus: †Magnipterygius; Maisch & Matzke, 2022
- Species: †M. huenei

Binomial name
- †Magnipterygius huenei Maisch & Matzke, 2022

= Magnipterygius =

Magnipterygius Temporal range: Lower Toarcian ~181 Ma

Species of ichthyosaur

Magnipterygius is an extinct genus of primitive ichthyosaur found in the Early Jurassic (Lower Toarcian) Posidonia Shale of Dotternhausen, Germany. The holotype specimen is SMNS96922, a nearly complete articulated skeleton. This genus is a small-sized ichthyosaur with similarities to Stenopterygius, measuring around 1.2 metres (3.9 ft) in length. It is classified as either a valid genus of the family Stenopterygiidae or a junior synonym of Stenopterygius.

== Discovery and naming ==
The holotype specimen was uncovered in 2011 in the quarry of Holcim, Dotternhausen, with the consent of the State Museum of Natural History Stuttgart. It was recovered all except the tail, left in a block in situ. The preparation was done with air abrasive, using chemically clean iron power at low pressure. During the examination the specimen was found to represent a completely new genus of ichthyosaur, and was named Magnipterygius huenei, with the genus name being a reference to the Warcraft videogame franchise, specifically to the dwarven king Magni Bronzebeard, while the specific name honors Friedrich Freiherr von Huene and his dedication to the study of the Posidonia Shale fauna.
