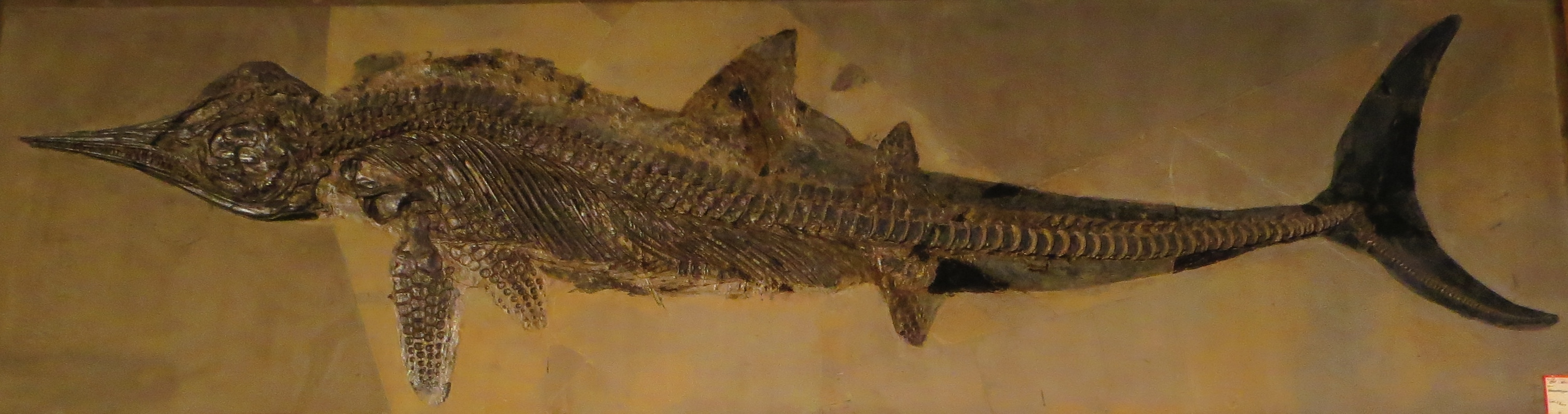
- Fossil of H. typicus

Scientific classification
- Kingdom: Animalia
- Phylum: Chordata
- Class: Reptilia
- Order: †Ichthyosauria
- Node: †Parvipelvia
- Genus: †Hauffiopteryx; Maisch, 2008

Type species
- †Hauffiopteryx typicus (von Huene, 1931 [originally Stenopterygius typicus])

Other species
- †Hauffiopteryx altera Maxwell and Cortés, 2020

Synonyms
- Stenopterygius hauffianus typica von Huene, 1931; Stenopterygius typicus von Huene, 1931

= Hauffiopteryx =

Hauffiopteryx Temporal range: Early Jurassic, 182.7–181.8 Ma

Extinct genus of reptiles

Hauffiopteryx is an extinct genus of ichthyosaur known from Germany, Luxembourg, Switzerland and Somerset of the United Kingdom. Two species are known: H. typicus and H. altera.

== History of study ==
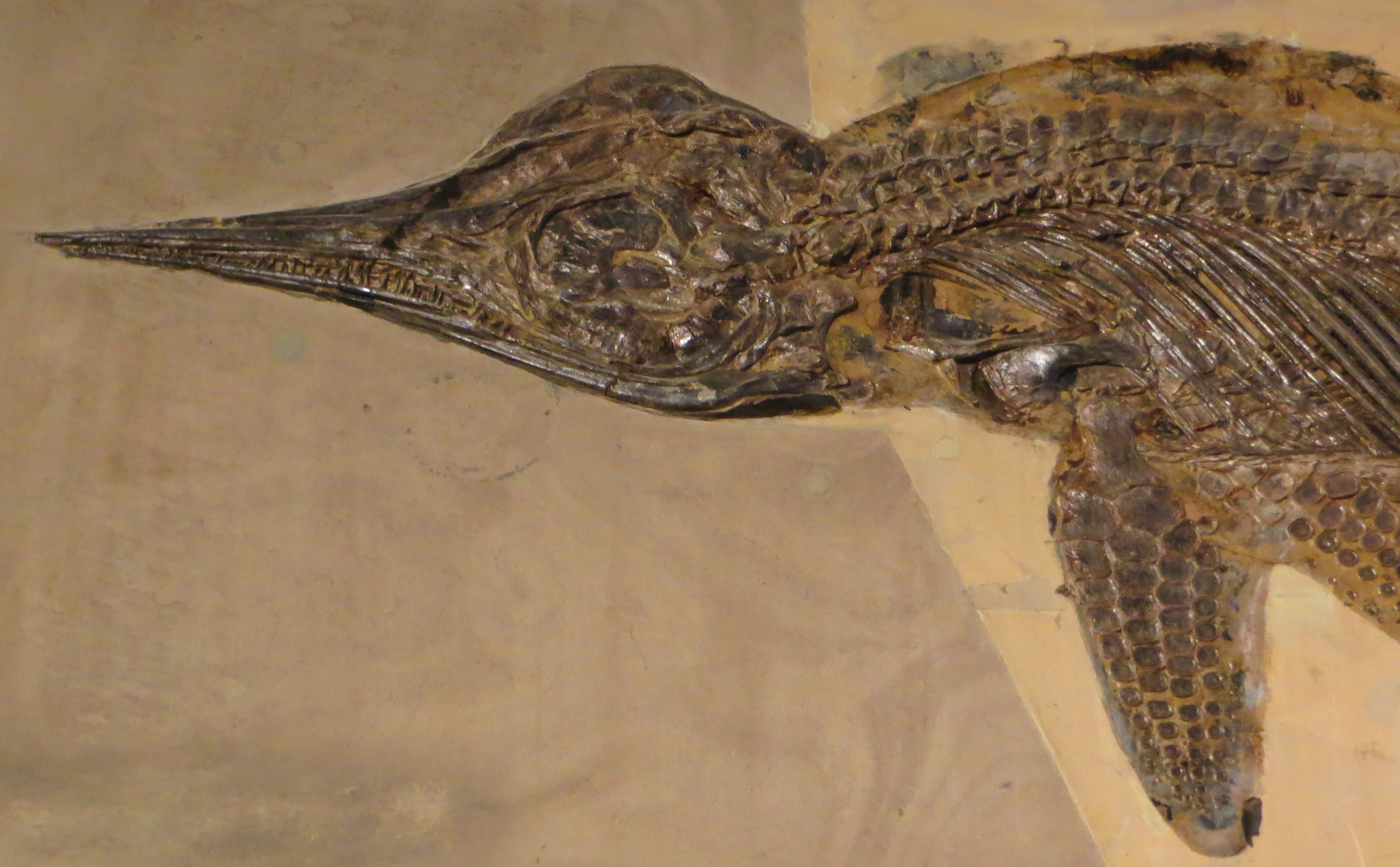
Front of H. typicus fossil

Hauffiopteryx was first described by Michael W. Maisch on the basis of some specimens that previously referred to Stenopterygius hauffianus. Maisch found that the lectotype of S. hauffianus can be determined as Stenopterygius cf. S. quadriscissus at best, and therefore this species should be considered a nomen dubium. He also found out that most specimens previously referred to S. hauffianus can be referred to S. quadriscissus, while the rest belongs to a highly distinctive new taxon that can't be referred to any valid species of Stenopterygius.

Hauffiopteryx is known from the lectotype GPIT 1491/4, articulated complete skeleton which preserved the skull and some soft tissues. The animal is about 1.93 m (6.3 ft) in length. It was collected from the Harpoceras elegantulum-exaratum ammonoid subzones (more specifically Lias ε II4), Harpoceras falcifer zone, of the famous Posidonien-Schiefer lagerstätte (Posidonia Shale) of Holzmaden, dating to the early Toarcian stage of the Early Jurassic, about 182 million years ago. Referred specimens from Holzmaden, Germany and Dudelange, Luxembourg include MHH '9', WAT 1, SMNS 51552, SMNS 80225 and probably the poorly preserved SMNS 81965. They were collected from the Harpoceras semicelatum-elegantulum-exaratum ammonoid subzones (Lias ε II1-5, about 182.7-181.8 mya), Harpoceras tenuicostatum-falcifer zones, of the Posidonia Shale.

Additional materials were described by Hannah Caine and Michael J. Benton in 2011, from the early Toarcian of Strawberry Bank, Ilminster of England. The specimens are all juveniles or infants which preserved almost complete skeletons and some skulls. They include BRLSI M1399 (which was described earlier by Maisch), BRLSI M1400, BRLSI M1401, BRLSI M1403, BRLSI M1404 and BRLSI M1406.

=== Etymology ===
Hauffiopteryx was originally recognized by Friedrich von Huene in 1931 as a subspecies of S. hauffianus and named Stenopterygius hauffianus typica. Michael W. Maisch in 2008 elevated it to specific rank and reassigned to its own genus, Hauffiopteryx. The type species is therefore Hauffiopteryx typicus. The generic name honors the Hauff family from Holzmaden, for their generation-long work to increase the knowledge on the Posidonia Shale and its fauna, especially the ichthyosaurs, and pteryx (πτερυξ), Greek for "fin" or "wing". The specific name means typical. H. altera comes from the Latin word meaning "different from" or "other" due to the differences between it and H. typicus.

== Description ==
Size comparison

Hauffiopteryx is a relatively small ichthyosaur, reaching 2–3 m (6.6–9.8 ft) in length.

=== Skull ===
The snout of Hauffiopteryx is short, but also very thin, tapering to a point. The outer surface of the tooth crowns is smooth, and the back teeth are larger than those in front. The upper jaw is slightly longer than the lower jaw, though this overbite is not carried to the extreme seen in Excalibosaurus and Eurhinosaurus. The nasals form the majority of the snout's midline, rather than the premaxillae (upper tooth-bearing bones). In H. altera, the tallest points of the maxillae (rear upper tooth-bearing bones) are positioned behind the external nares (openings that housed the nostrils), in contrast to H. typicus, where the tallest points are instead located beneath these openings. Part of the borders of the external nares are formed by the prefrontals (paired bones situated on the upper edges of the eye sockets). In H. altera, this configuration blocks the lacrimals (paired bones in front of the eye sockets) from forming part of the external nares, whereas the lacrimals do reach the external nares in H. typicus. A further difference between the two species lies in the shape of their lacrimals; in H. typicus, they are triradiate, while those of H. altera are massive and triangular.

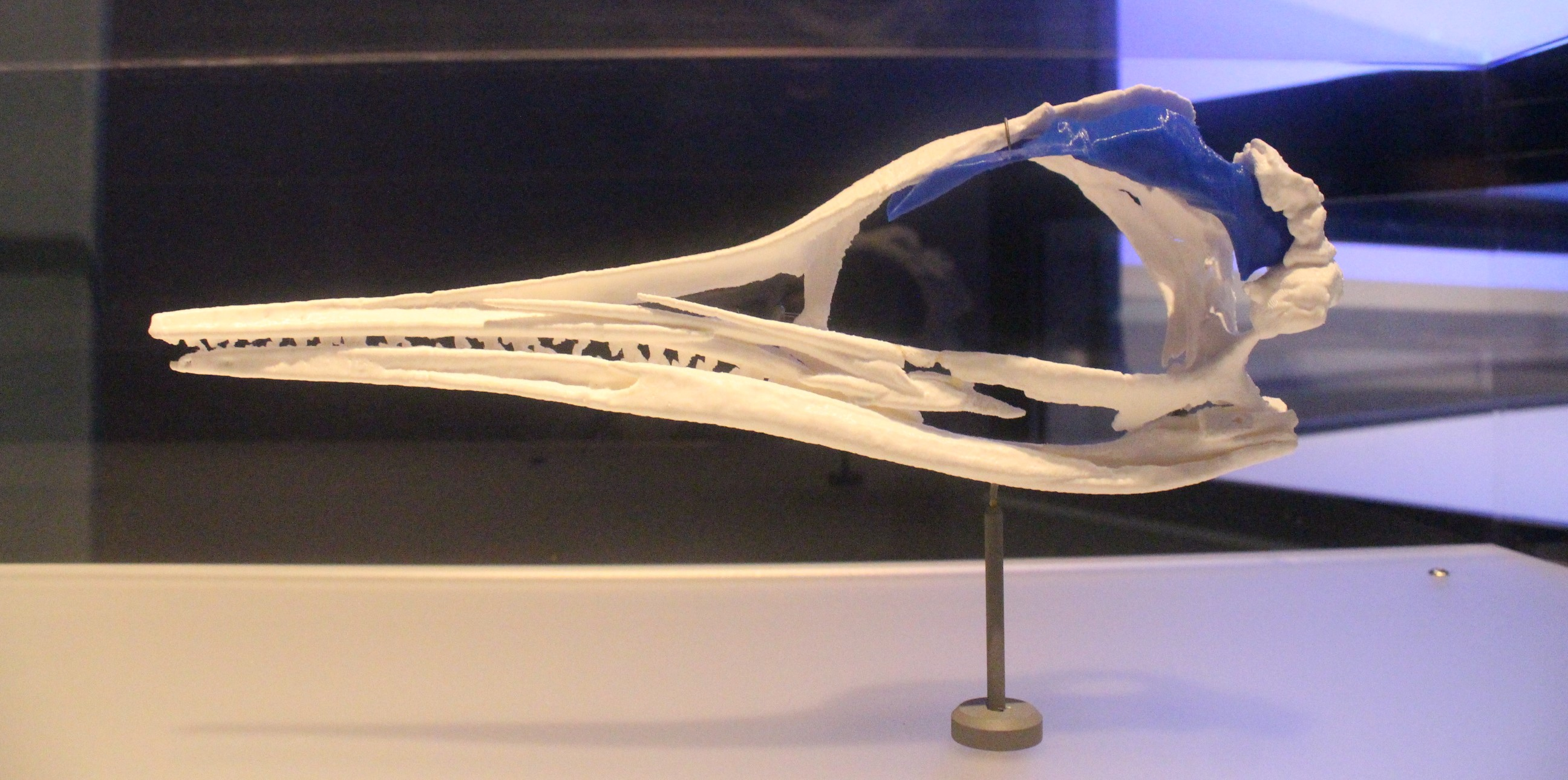
3D-printed reconstruction of the skull and brain of H. typicus, Field Museum of Natural History

The orbits (eye sockets) of H. typicus are especially large and circular. In front of the orbits, the nasals of H. typicus curve upwards. The nasals extend further back in H. altera than in H. typicus, though the nasals of Hauffiopteryx do not touch the parietals (a pair of skull roof bones). Externally, the prefrontals have greater surface area than the postfrontals, especially so in H. altera. The frontals (a pair of skull roof bones) form most of the border of the pineal foramen, a small opening on the midline of the skull. Instead of being in line with the front edges of the supratemporal fenestrae (paired openings on the top of the skull's rear), the foramen is instead located in front of them. The supratemporal fenestrae themselves are rounded and small. The supratemporals (paired skull roof bones) have wavy edges. Behind the orbits, the skull is short from front to back, with the cheek region deflected so that it faces backwards. The rear face basioccipital (braincase bone to which the vertebral column attaches) bears a considerable amount of surface which is not involved in the joint between the skull and the spine.

=== Postcranial skeleton ===
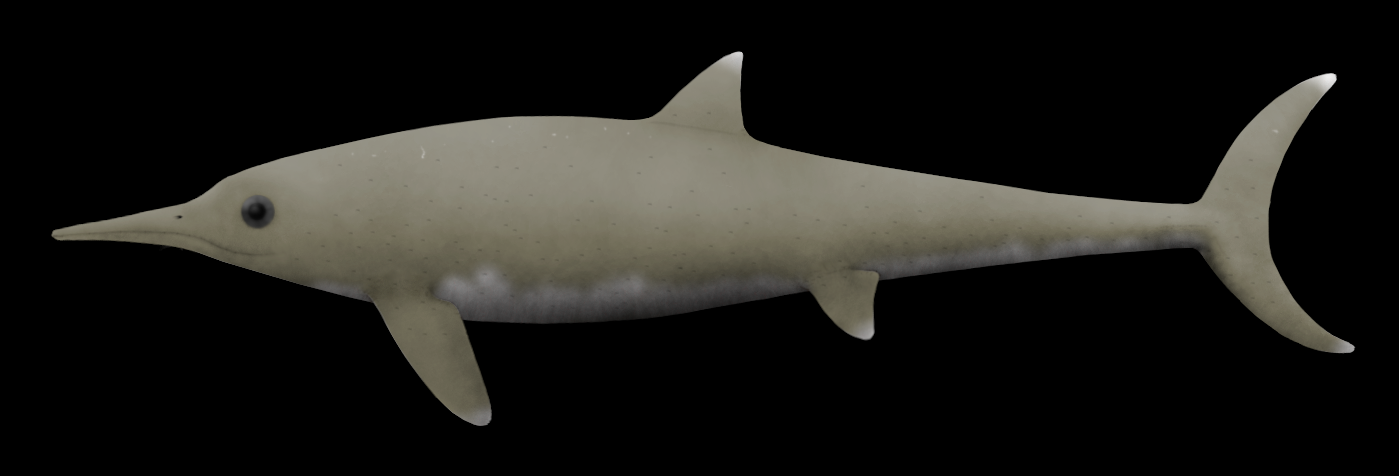
Life restoration of H. typicus

In 2011, Caine and Benton stated that Hauffiopteryx has fewer than 46 vertebrae in front of its hips (presacral vertebrae) and typically over 34 but under 39 between its hips and the bend in its tail. Maxwell and Cortés in 2020 described the lectotype as having 45 or 46 presacral vertebrae and a total of 81 vertebrae before the bend in the tail (preflexural vertebrae), with this bend composed of three vertebrae followed by more than 55 postflexural vertebrae. The upper ends of the dorsal ribs (those in the trunk region) are strongly forked, making them double-headed. Gastralia (belly ribs) are present along the underside of the trunk. This series of elements reaches far back, all the way to the level of the 35th vertebra.

The scapulae (shoulder blades) of Hauffiopteryx have wide lower ends due to their front margins extending forwards. The front edge of each coracoid (shoulder bones located below the scapulae) is concave. No space is enclosed between the humeri (upper arm bones) and the radii and ulnae (lower arm bones), being tightly packed together. This is also the case for the other bones in the upper parts of the limbs, forming a mosaic-like pattern. Each forelimb contains four main digits, and the front edge of the limb consists of some elements with indentations on their front edges. The lower pelvic bones (the pubic bones and ischia) are narrow and pillar-shaped. Unusually, the ends of these bones which form the hip socket are fused together, but the bones markedly diverge away from the socket. The thin femora (thighbones) each bear a strong site for the articulation of the fibula (rear shin bone). The fibulae are also much larger than the tibiae (front shin bones). While the front edges of the hindlimbs contain some notched elements like the forelimbs, there are only three main digits in each rear limb. These digits closely approach each other towards the tip of the limb.

== Classification ==
Both the original description by Maisch and the redescription of the English specimens found that Hauffiopteryx might be either a basalmost member of Eurhinosauria or a basalmost member of Thunnosauria (which is an equivalent position to a basalmost member of Stenopterygiidae sensu Maisch [2008] with exclusion of Ichthyosaurus).
