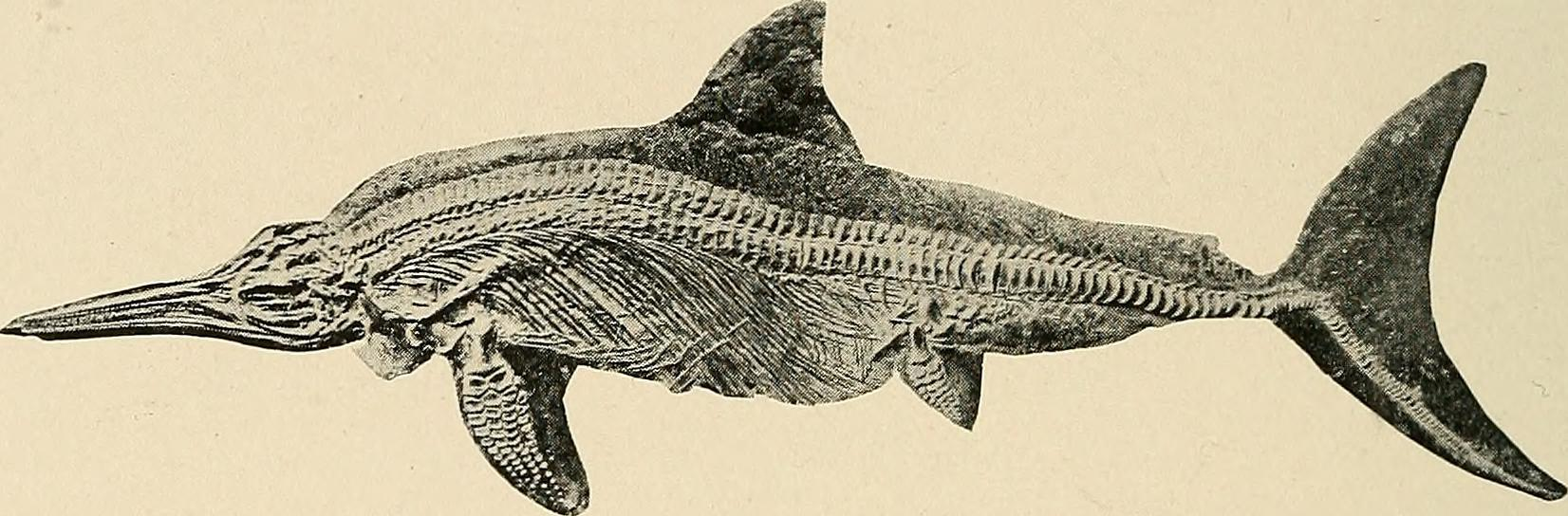
- Stenopterygius quadriscissus fossil preserving soft tissue envelope

Scientific classification
- Domain: Eukaryota
- Kingdom: Animalia
- Phylum: Chordata
- Class: Reptilia
- Order: †Ichthyosauria
- Clade: †Baracromia
- Family: †Stenopterygiidae; Jaekel, 1904

Genera
- †Chacaicosaurus?; †Magnipterygius; †Stenopterygius

= Stenopterygiidae =

Stenopterygiidae Temporal range: Early Jurassic, 183–179 Ma Possible Middle Jurassic record

Extinct genus of marine reptiles

Stenopterygiidae are a family of the Ichthyosauria, a group of extinct marine reptiles that superficially resemble fish. They are distinguished from other ichthyosaurs by the arrangement of the flipper bones and by the broad attachment of the fins to the body.
