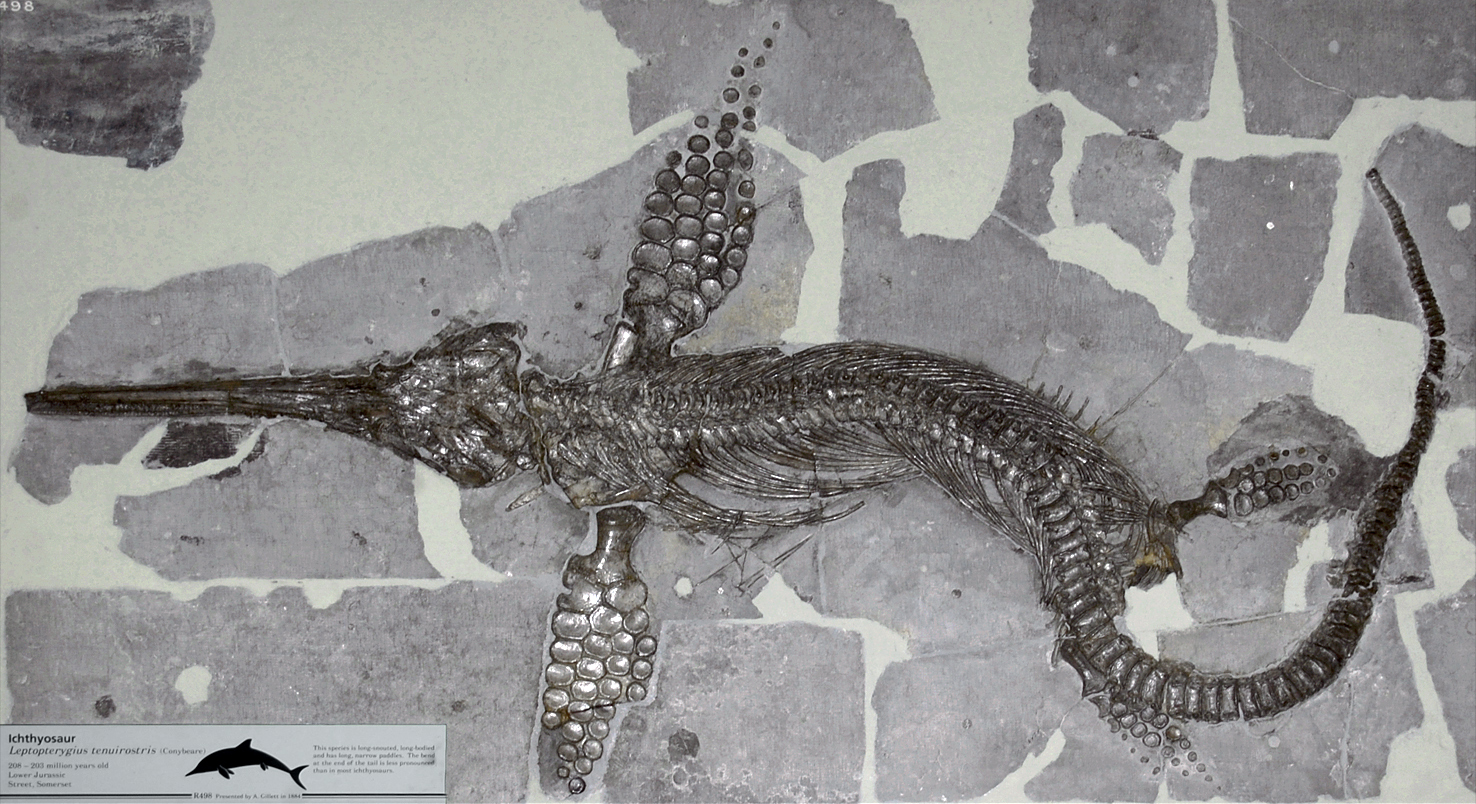
- skeleton of Leptonectes tenuirostris (NHMUK PV R 498)

Scientific classification
- Kingdom: Animalia
- Phylum: Chordata
- Class: Reptilia
- Order: †Ichthyosauria
- Family: †Leptonectidae
- Genus: †Leptonectes; McGowan, 1996

Species
- L. moorei McGowan and Milner, 1999; L. solei (McGowan, 1993); L. tenuirostris (Conybeare, 1822) (type species)

Synonyms
- Leptopterygius Huene, 1929

= Leptonectes =

Leptonectes Temporal range: Late Triassic - Early Jurassic, Rhaetian–Pliensbachian

Extinct genus of reptiles

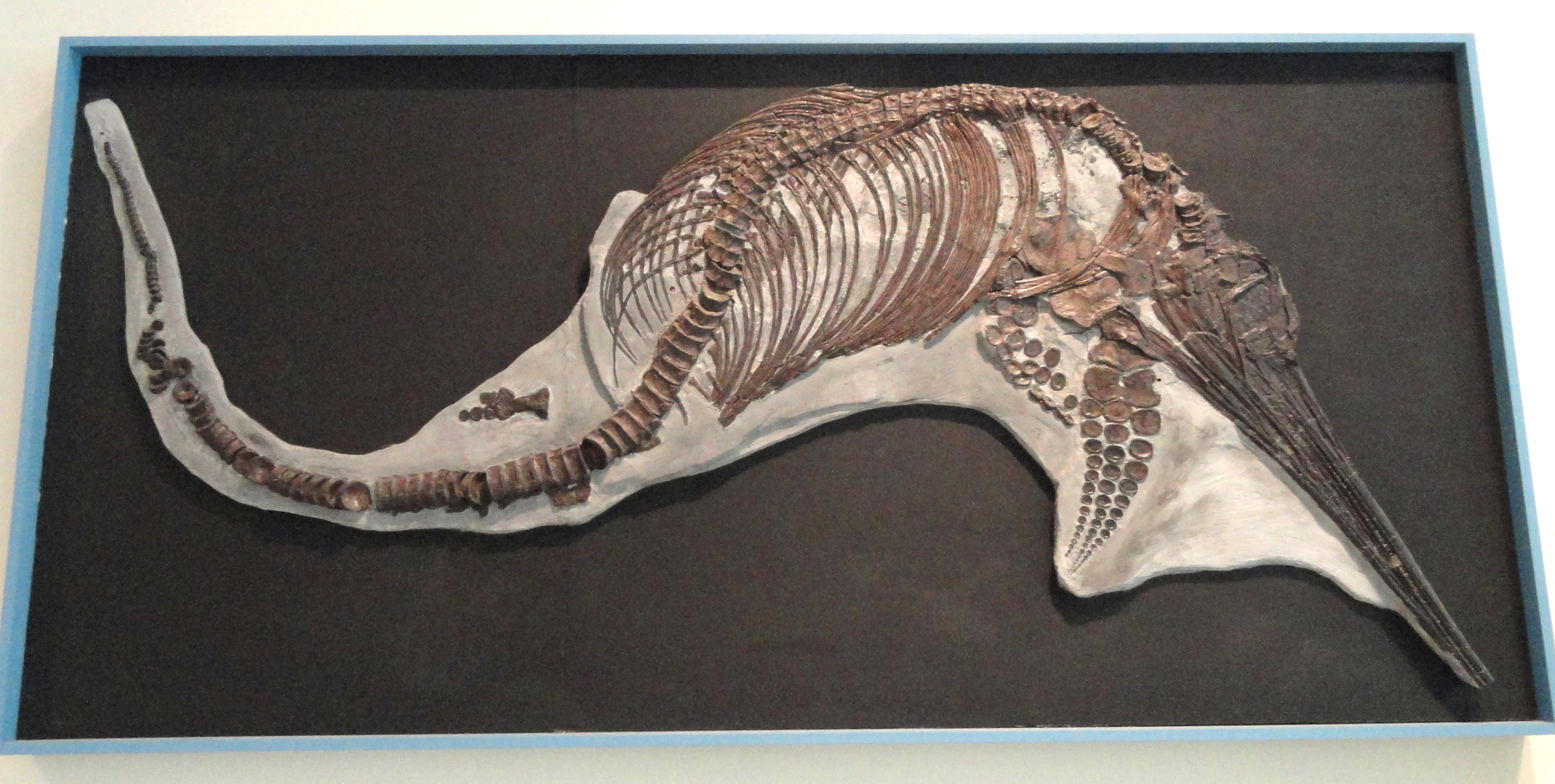
L. tenuirostris, Royal Ontario Museum

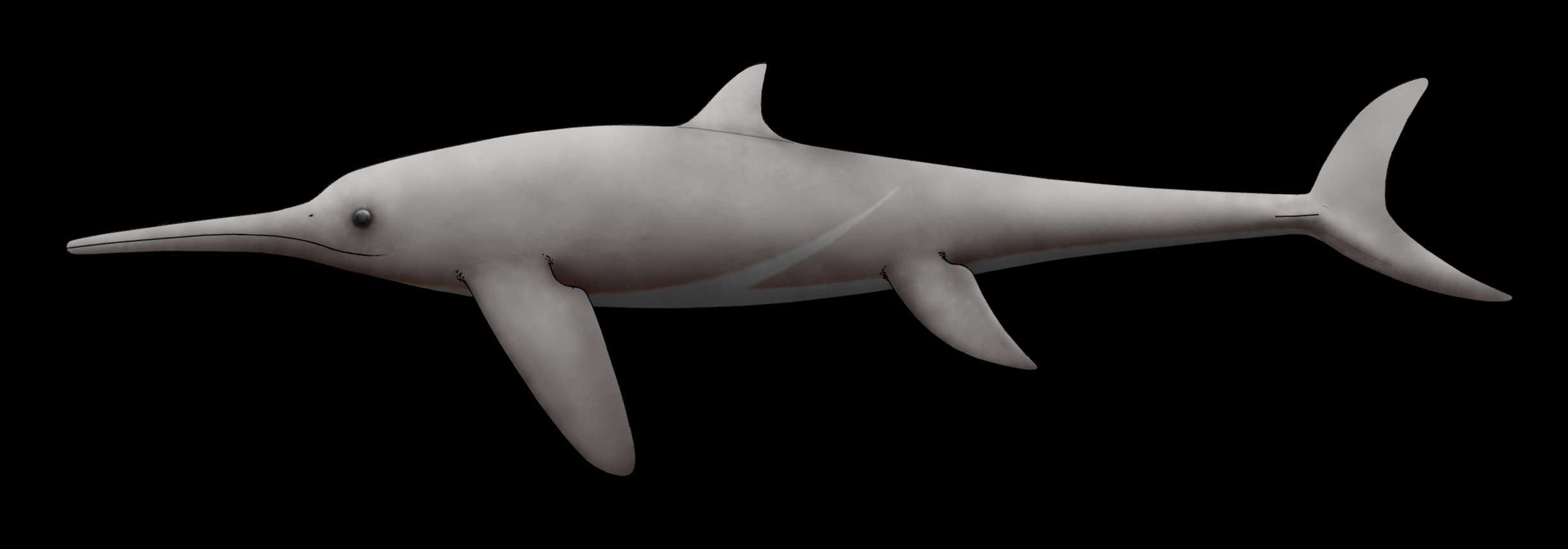
Life restoration

Leptonectes is a genus of ichthyosaur that lived in the Late Triassic to Early Jurassic (Rhaetian - Pliensbachian). Fossils have been found in Belgium, Germany, Spain and the United Kingdom. A possible specimen from Switzerland first reported in 2006, has been reclassified as that of Hauffiopteryx. The type species, L. tenuirostris, reached 4 metres (13 ft) long, whereas L. moorei (NHMUK PV R 14370) likely reached 3 metres (9.8 ft) long; the largest species, L. solei, was approximately 5–6 metres (16–20 ft) long.

== See also ==
- List of ichthyosaurs
- Timeline of ichthyosaur research
