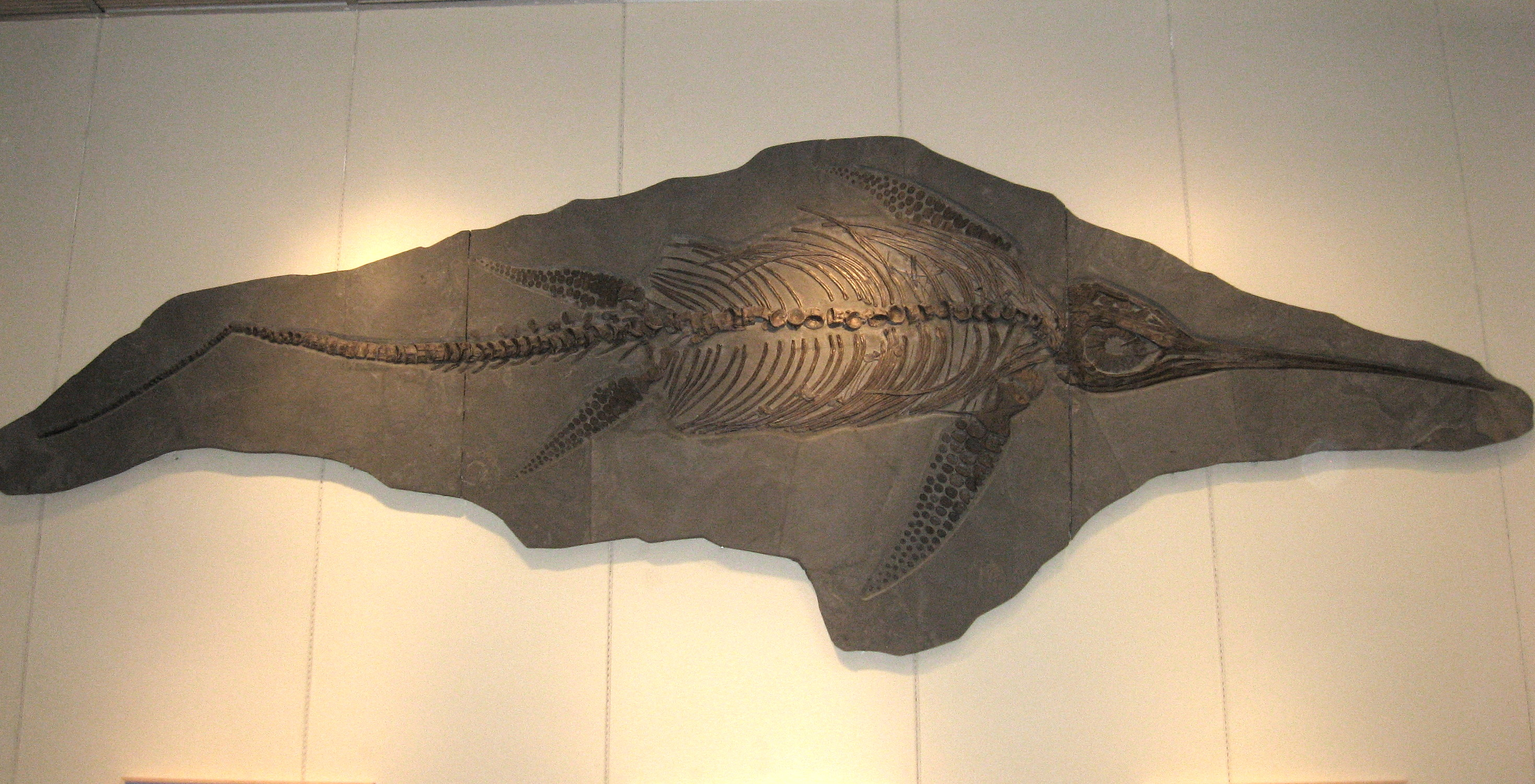
- A 6.4 m (21 ft) Eurhinosaurus specimen

Scientific classification
- Kingdom: Animalia
- Phylum: Chordata
- Class: Reptilia
- Order: †Ichthyosauria
- Family: †Leptonectidae
- Genus: †Eurhinosaurus; Abel, 1909

Species
- E. longirostris (Mantell 1851) (type) (dubious); E. huenei Swinton, 1930; E. quenstedti Maisch 2022; E. mistelgauensis Spicher et al., 2025

= Eurhinosaurus =

Eurhinosaurus Temporal range: Toarcian ~183–175 Ma

Genus of leptonectid ichthyosaur from the Early Jurassic period

Eurhinosaurus (Greek for 'well-nosed lizard'; eu- meaning 'well or good', rhino- meaning 'nose' and -saurus meaning 'lizard') is an extinct genus of ichthyosaur from the Early Jurassic (Toarcian), ranging between 183 and 175 million years. Fossils of this genus have been found across Western Europe, such as in England, southern and northern Germany, the Benelux, France and Switzerland.

Eurhinosaurus were large-bodied, with a fossil of an adult individual reaching 7 metres (23 ft) in length. A distinctive feature of the genus is that their upper jaws protruded past their lower jaws (comparable to billfish) and were covered with up and downwards-pointing teeth. They inhabited the open ocean.

== History and discovery ==
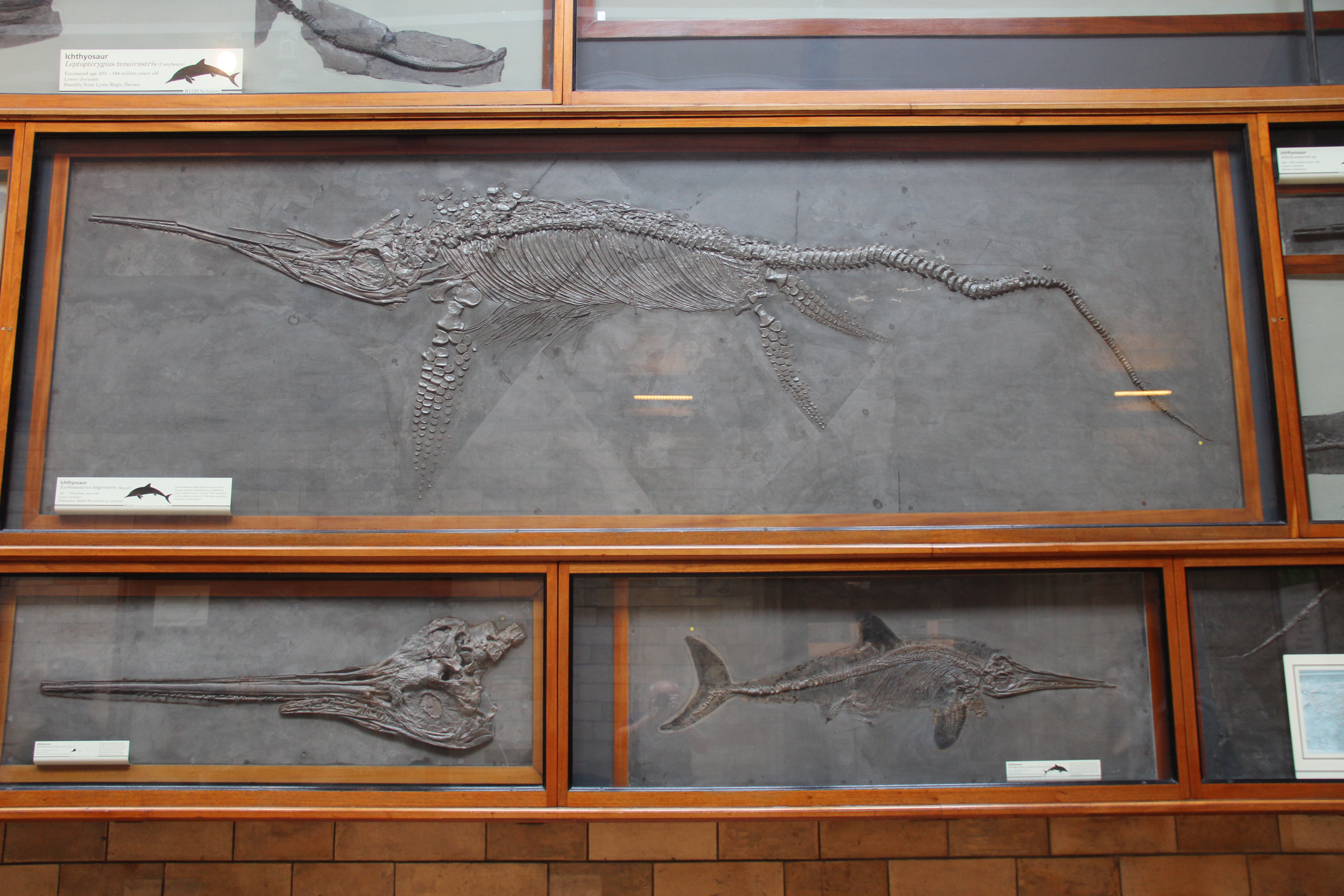
Skeleton (NHMUK PV R5465) and skull (NHMUK PV R3938) of Eurhinosaurus, along with a skeleton (NHMUK PV R4086) of Stenopterygius, Natural History Museum, UK

The name Ichthyosaurus longirostris was first published by Gideon Mantell in 1851 in a guide to the paleontological galleries of the old British Museum, to name one of the displayed ichthyosaurian specimens. That specimen had an exceedingly slender and elongated muzzle, but the skull was crushed, preserving few characteristics. The specific name, longirostris, was just affixed to the specimen. Since the diagnostic features were so unclear, scientists at that time were not able to name this specimen.

The first skull of Eurhinosaurus longirostris was found by Richard Owen and Jaeger in Switzerland in 1856, which showed clearly shortened mandibles. The genus Eurhinosaurus was erected in 1909 in a paper describing the Miocene cetacean Eurhinodelphis cocheteuxi; Abel noted that it was not certain whether the cetacean's mandible extended to the tip of the snout or whether it was abbreviated, which was the case in Ichthyosaurus longirostris. He considered the weak, attenuated mandible of Ichthyosaurus longirostris, along with other distinguishing features, to be enough to erect a separate genus, this being Eurhinosaurus; the type species by monotypy was E. longirostris.

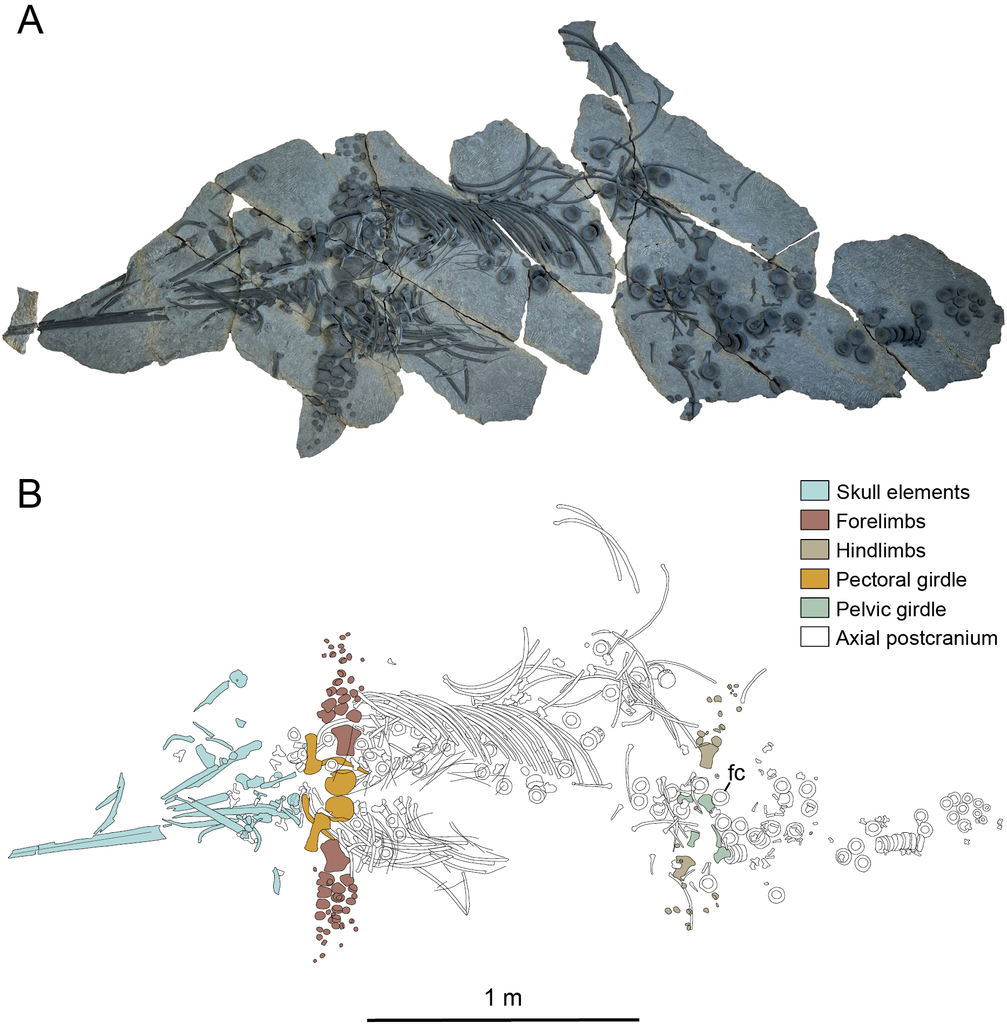
UMO BT 011 221.00, the holotype of E. mistelgauensis

In 2022, a second species, E. quenstedti was described from Germany. The original species, E. longirostris was considered dubious due to the poor preservation of the type specimen, with the species E. huenei, based on a complete skeleton described in 1930, resurrected to replace it. Three years later, another species — E. mistelgauensis — was described by Spicher et al., (2025). The holotype, UMO BT 011 221.00, comprises an almost complete specimen with 3D preservation.

== Description ==
Size of E. longirostris compared to a human

Eurhinosaurus was a large-bodied, small-toothed, slender ichthyosaur; its general morphology was typical, with a fish-like fusiform body including well developed dorsal fin, hypocercal caudal fin, paired pectoral and pelvic fins, along with remarkably large eyes. As a reptile, Eurhinosaurus did not have gills and breathed with their lungs.

The vertebral column was composed of roughly 50 precaudal-, 45 caudal peduncle-, and fewer than 100 fluke vertebrae. The upper jaw was extremely long and lower jaw was weak but much shorter, which showed an extreme "overbite", much as in the extant swordfish Xiphias. The upper jaw was more than twice as long as the lower jaw. The orbits of Eurhinosaurus were very large and directed anterolaterally. Their huge orbits were combined with an extremely short cheek region and reduced upper temporal fenestra; their temporal fenestra was extremely small. The external naris was large and retracted. Like most post-Triassic ichthyosaurs, the parietal foramen was located on the connection point between parietal and frontal.

Eurhinosaurus had elongated, slender and straight teeth without distinct surface ornamentation of the crown. Their teeth were delicate, sharply pointed and the enamel was smooth.

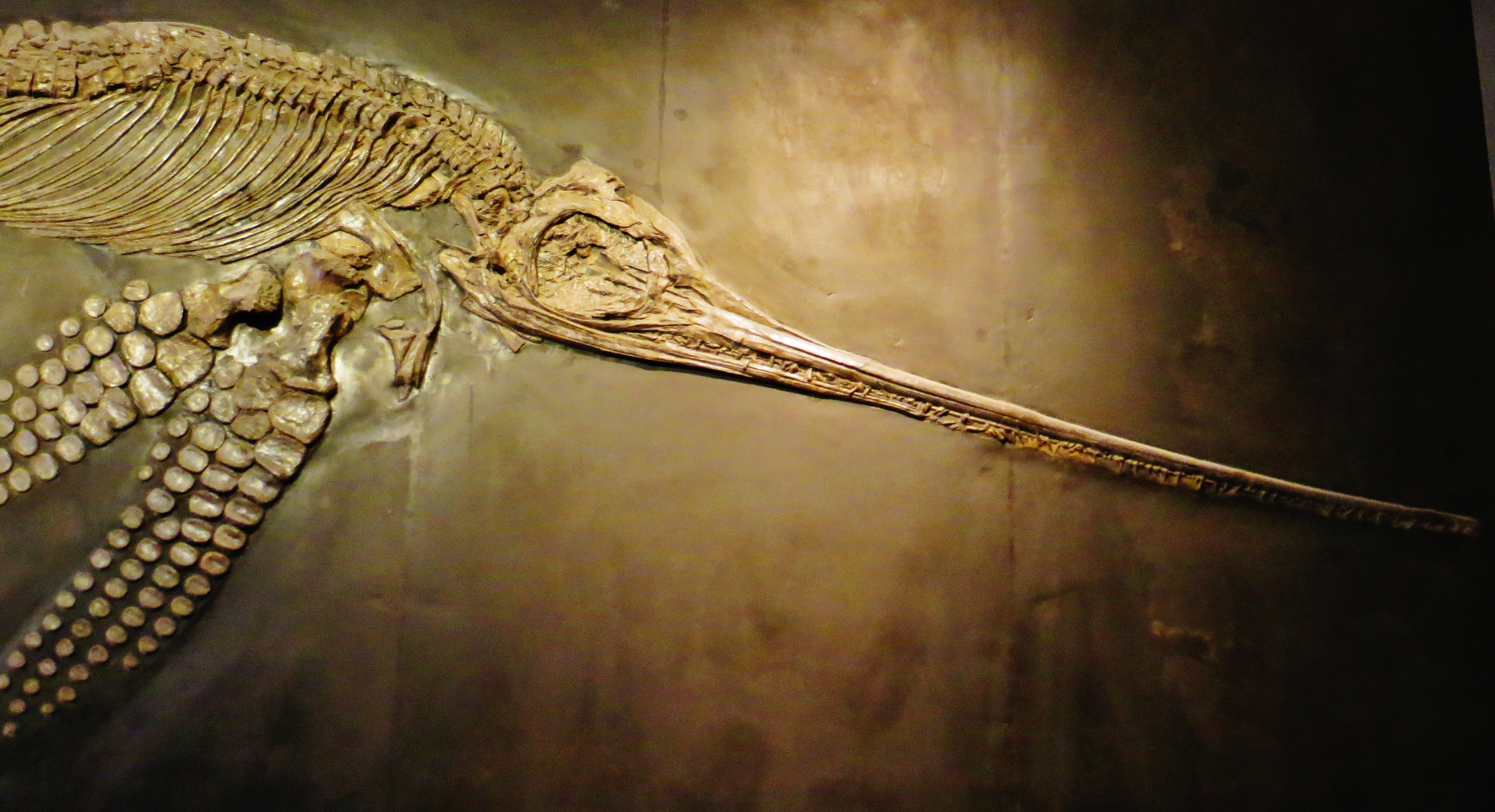
Skull of E. longirostris

The supratemporal of Eurhinosaurus was very large and wide in the dorsal view, reaching the orbital margin. Their fenestra supratemporalis was small and external exposure of the frontal was strongly reduced. Its frontal was covered by nasals in the dorsal view. The prefrontal was very small and the postfrontal was large. The postorbital region of the skull (behind the eye sockets) is very narrow and the postorbital lacks a posterior lamina. Eurhinosaurus had the quadratojugal with long posteromedial processus quadratus and pierced by a foramen of unknown function. Some small inter-pterygoid vacuities were found on the palate and it had short and wide pterygoid from the ventral view. Its parasphenoid endes anterolateral to the unpaired carotid foramen. The lower jaw of Eurhinosaurus had long processus retroarticularis. The atlas and axis abut very closely but were not completely fused together. No rib articulations were present on fluke vertebrae. Compared with Suevoleviathan and Temnodontosaurus, the fluke of Eurhinosaurus was relatively short. The caudal fin of Eurhinosaurus was hypocercal in shape with the notochord having extended into the lower lobe; cartilaginous chevrons which could be used for swimming in a high speed.

Speculative life restoration of E. longirostris

In the vertebral column, the neural spins of the dorsal vertebrae were remarkably short, less than the height of the centrum, which was also found in other lower Jurassic large-bodied ichthyosaur such as Temnodontosaurus and Platypterygius. The forefins of Eurhinosaurus offered a peculiarity: the radius was much larger than the ulna. Besides, the fins were very long and slender with four primary digits, no accessory digits and strong hyperphalangy. Their hindfins were about two thirds the length of forefins.

In the shoulder girdle, the interclavicle is small and T-shaped. The scapula is elongated with a narrow, expanded dorsal blade. The post-glenoidal portion of the coracoid was larger than the much reduced anterior extension. The coracoid was rounded with a notch in the anterolateral margin. The humerus had a constricted, very thickened head and expanded, flattened distal end.

The pelvic girdle was moderately reduced and also showed the fusion of pubis and ilium seen Stenopterygius. The plate-like bones of the pelvis (pubis and ischium) had modified to the elongate and waisted bones. The pubis in this genus lacked an obturator foramen.

== Classification ==
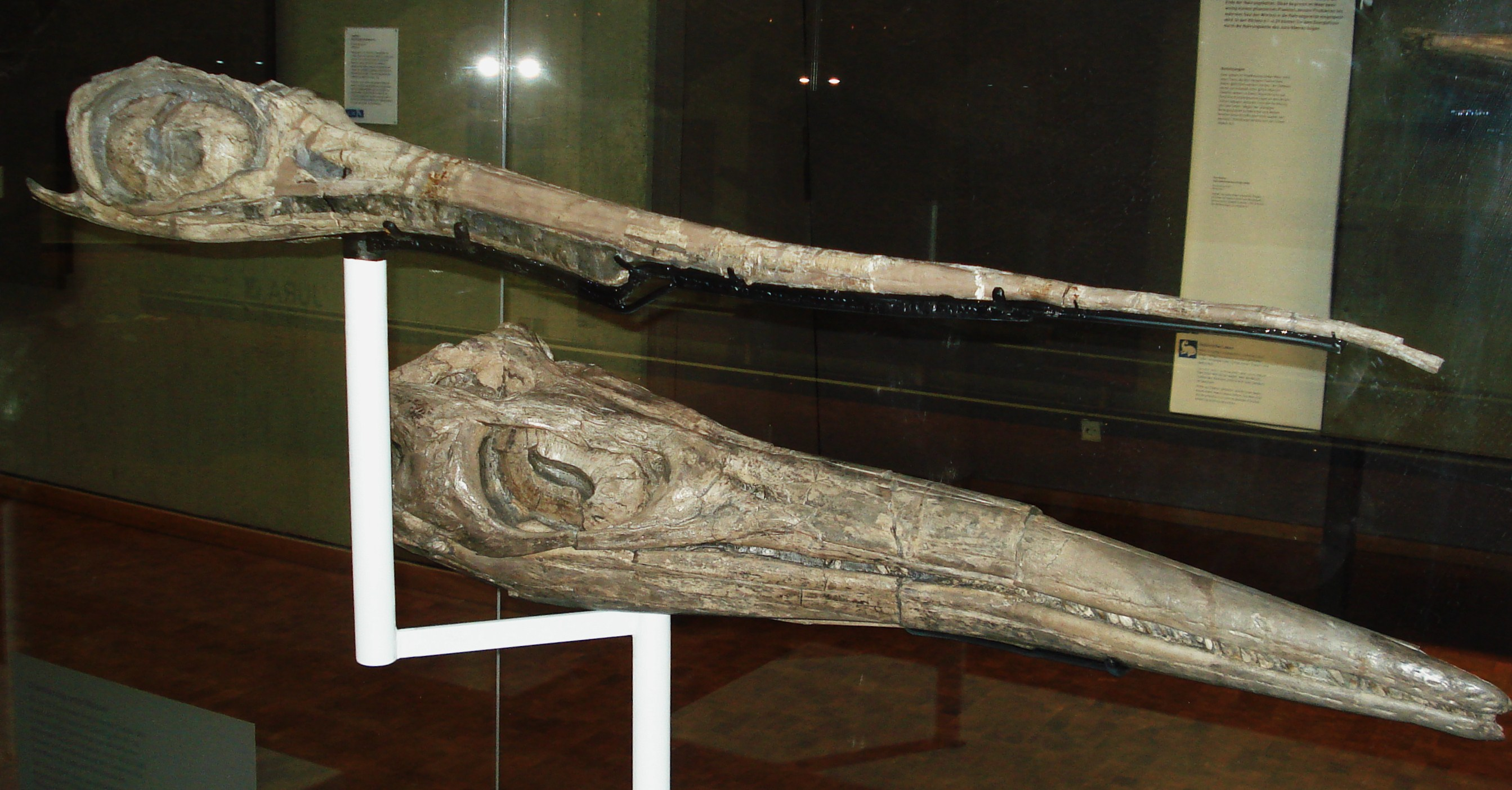
Skulls of Eurhinosaurus and the related Temnodontosaurus

The cladogram below is based on Sander (2000), Maisch and Matzke (2000), Maisch (2010) and an analysis by Marek et al (2015).

- Parvipelvia
  - Macgowania
  - Hudsonelpidia
  - Neoichthyosauria
    - - Temnodontosaurus
      - Leptonectidae
        - Leptonectes
        - - Excalibosaurus
          - Eurhinosaurus
    - - Suevoleviathan
      - - Ichthyosaurus
        - Thunnosauria
          - Stenopterygius
          - Ophthalmosauridae

== Palaeobiology ==
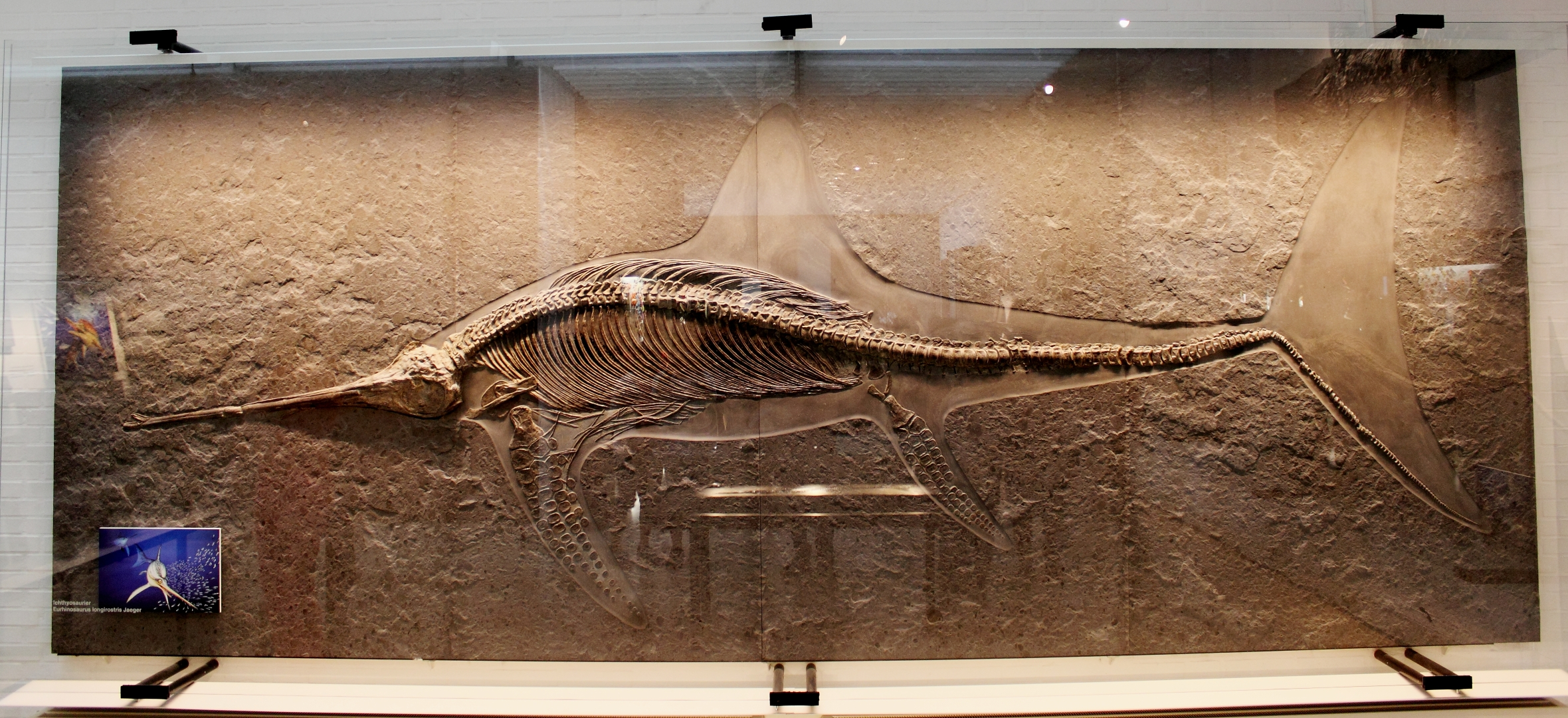
Eurhinosaurus longirostris in the Urweltmuseum Hauff

Like other ichthyosaurs, Eurhinosaurus was a high-speed swimmer, using the lateral oscillations of their caudal fluke on a flexible tail stock for swimming. The postcranial morphology of Eurhinosaurus was intermediate between those of very fast-swimmers and slower, more flexible predators. Eurhinosaurus had a slender fusiform body with long limbs and fluke. Neural spines of fluke vertebrae were very short and almost erect. The relatively large hind limbs of Eurhinosaurus suggested their use in steering and probably propulsion at a very low speed. The swimming style of Eurhinosaurus was thunniform. Their hypocercal caudal fin, which was mounted on the narrow peduncle, moved through the water in a sinuous curve by the powerful muscles of the posterior trunk and the anterior tail region. From this motion, a strong force would be generated to push Eurhinosaurus forward.

Like other ichthyosaurs, Eurhinosaurus probably was a deep diver. Eurhinosaurus has a very large orbit with scleral ring, a circular shaped bone that was embedded in their eye. The scleral ring was probably used to maintain the shape of their eyes against the high pressure in the deep sea while they were diving. The big eye of Eurhinosaurus suggested that they had very good visual capacity, which helped them see clearly in the dark environment of the deep sea.

=== Feeding mechanisms and diet ===
Inferred from their extreme overbite, the genus probably used a predatory strategy close to Xiphias, or the swordfish of today. The elongated, densely toothed upper jaw was used as weapon to penetrate or injure small soft prey items. Eurhinosaurus belongs to the "Pierce I" predatory guild, so its dietary habits were consisted of small and soft, very delicate prey, such as small fishes, oysters, and squid-like cephalopods.

== Palaeoenvironment ==
Eurhinosaurus lived in the open ocean, far away from the coastline. Eurhinosaurus was not like other ichthyosaurs and marine reptiles of the early Toarcian which showed a distinct provinciality. They were not endemic, but had wide paleobiogeographic distribution in Western Europe. Fossils of Eurhinosaurus were found in the limestone and wackestone concretions in England, the Benelux, France, Switzerland and in southern and northern Germany. Limestone and wackestone indicated marine environments because of their aquatic formation process, where they required large water bodies to be deposited. Besides, the fossil of the Eurhinosaurus was found with some other ichthyosaurus or marine creatures such as ammonites. This was also the evidence could show Eurhinosaurus was a creature from the marine environment.

== See also ==
- List of ichthyosaurs
- Timeline of ichthyosaur research
