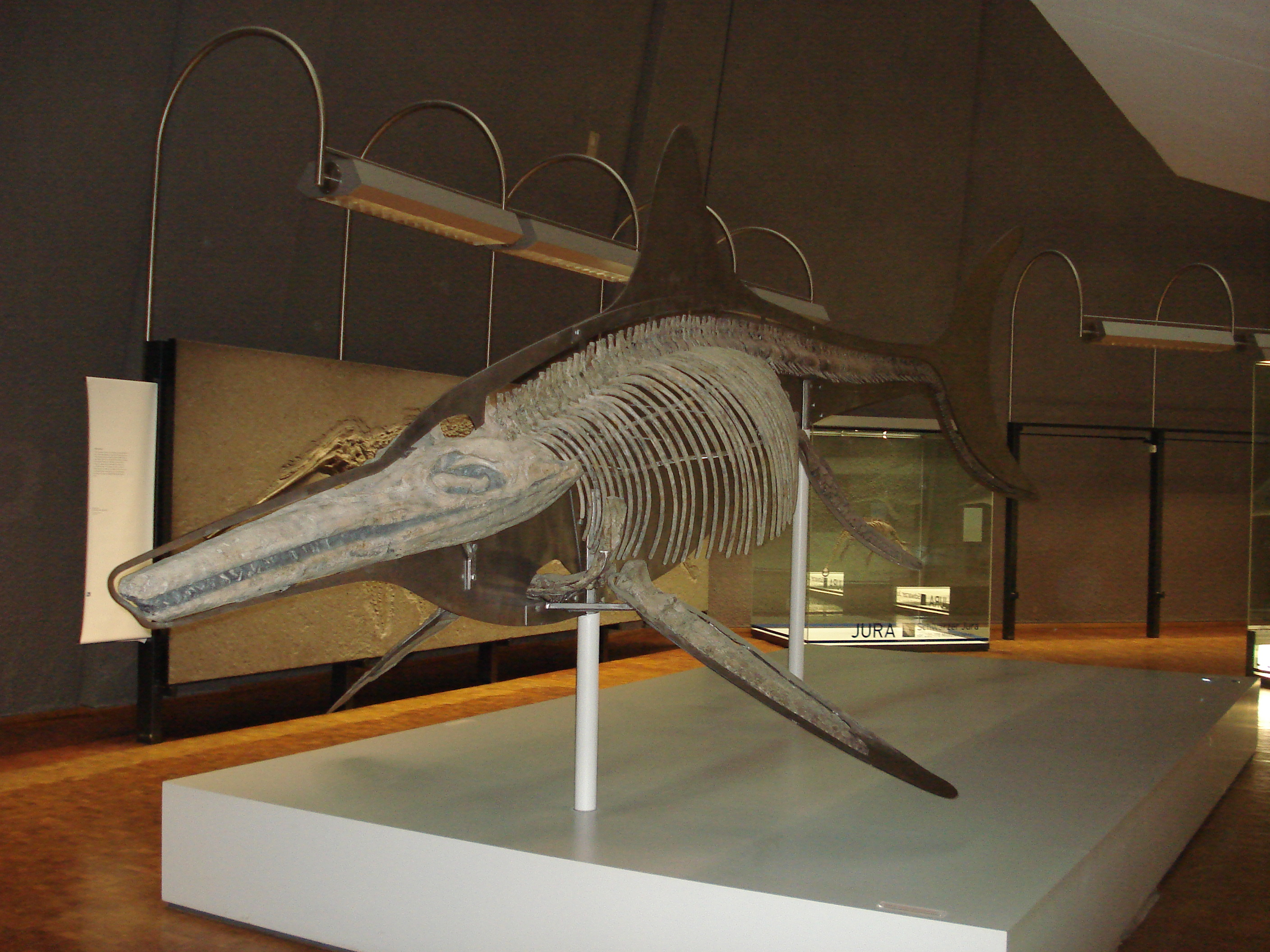
- Mounted skeleton of T. trigonodon in metal frame at the State Museum of Natural History Stuttgart, Germany

Scientific classification
- Kingdom: Animalia
- Phylum: Chordata
- Class: Reptilia
- Order: †Ichthyosauria
- Family: †Temnodontosauridae; McGowan, 1974
- Genus: †Temnodontosaurus; Lydekker, 1889

Type species
- †Ichthyosaurus platyodon Conybeare, 1822

Other species
- Recognized species: † T. trigonodon (von Theodori, 1843); † T. crassimanus (Blake, 1876); † T. zetlandicus (Seeley, 1876); † T. nuertingensis (von Huene, 1931); Disputed species: † T.? eurycephalus McGowan, 1974; † T.? azerguensis Martin et al., 2012

Synonyms
- List of synonyms: Synonyms of genus; Proteosaurus? Home, 1814; Oligostinus Hawkins, 1840 Synonyms of T. platyodon; Ichthyosaurus platyodon Conybeare, 1822; Ichthyosaurus chiroligostinus Hawkins, 1834; Ichthyosaurus lonchiodon Owen, 1840; Leptopterygius lonchiodon von Huene, 1922; Leptopterygius platyodon von Huene, 1922; Proteosaurus platyodon Hay, 1902; Temnodontosaurus risor McGowan, 1974 Synonyms of T. trigonodon; Ichthyosaurus trigonodon von Theodori, 1843; Ichthyosaurus ingens von Theodori, 1854; Ichthyosaurus multiscissus Quenstedt, 1885; Ichthyosaurus burgundiae Gaudry, 1892; Leptopterygius trigonodon von Huene, 1931; Leptopterygius burgundiae McGowan, 1979; Temnodontosaurus burgundiae McGowan, 1996 Synonymes of T. crassimanus; Ichthyosaurus crassimanus Blake, 1876 Synonyms of T. zetlandicus; Ichthyosaurus zetlandicus Seeley, 1880; Ichthyosaurus longifrons Owen, 1881; Stenopterygius zetlandicus von Huene, 1922 Synonyms of T. nuertingensis; Ichthyosaurus bellicosus Fraas, 1926; Leptopterygius nürtingensis von Huene, 1931

= Temnodontosaurus =

Temnodontosaurus Temporal range: Lower Hettangian-Toarcian 201.4–175.6 Ma

Extinct genus of reptiles

Temnodontosaurus (meaning "cutting-tooth lizard") is an extinct genus of large ichthyosaurs that lived during the Lower Jurassic in what is now Europe and possibly Chile. The first known fossil is a specimen consisting of a complete skull and partial skeleton discovered on a cliff by Joseph and Mary Anning around the early 1810s in Dorset, England. The anatomy of this specimen was subsequently analyzed in a series of articles written by Sir Everard Home between 1814 and 1819, making it the very first ichthyosaur to have been scientifically described. In 1822, the specimen was assigned to the genus Ichthyosaurus by William Conybeare, and more precisely to the species I. platyodon. Noting the large dental differences with other species of Ichthyosaurus, Richard Lydekker suggested in 1889 moving this species into a separate genus, which he named Temnodontosaurus. While many species have been assigned to the genus, only five are currently recognized as valid, the others being considered as synonymous, doubtful or possibly belonging to other taxa.

Generally estimated at 9 m (30 ft) long, Temnodontosaurus is one of the largest known ichthyosaurs, although not as imposing as some Triassic forms. Specimens assigned to the genus may nevertheless have reached larger measurements. As an ichthyosaur, Temnodontosaurus had flippers for limbs and a fin on the tail. Boasting eye sockets measuring more than 25 cm (9.8 in) wide, Temnodontosaurus quite possibly had the largest eyes known in the entire animal kingdom, rivaling in size those of the colossal squid. The snout appears to be longer than the mandible, being equipped with several sharp teeth (hence its name). On the basis of numerous very complete skeletons, it is estimated that the animal had at least more than 40 presacral vertebrae. Temnodontosaurus is a basal representative of the parvipelvian subgroup of ichthyosaurs, in addition to being its largest representative. A monotypic family, Temnodontosauridae, was even established in 1974 to include the genus. Various phylogenetic analyses as well as diagnostic problems concerning the genus make it, for the moment, a polyphyletic taxon (unnatural grouping), and therefore in need of revision.

== Research history ==
=== Discovery and identification ===
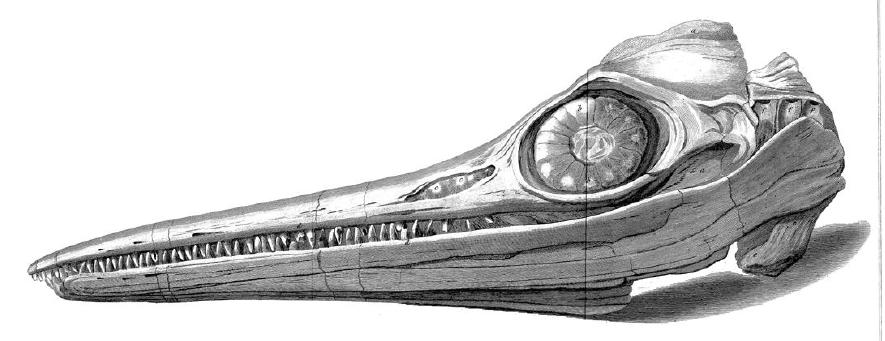
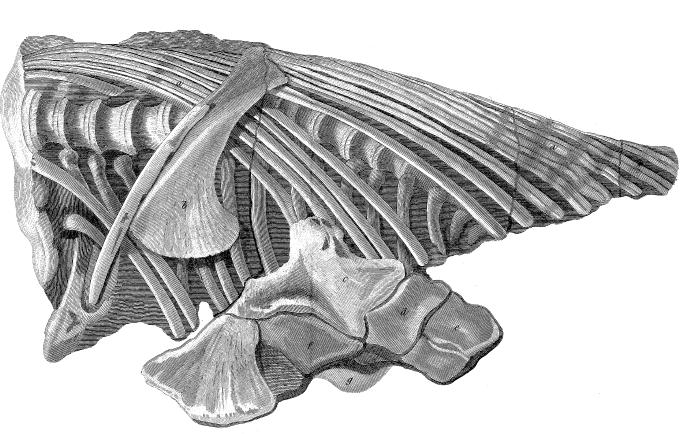
Illustrations by Sir Everard Home of the first known specimen of T. platyodon (NHMUK PV R 1158), discovered by Joseph and Mary Anning at Black Ven

Temnodontosaurus is historically the very first ichthyosaur to have been scientifically described. Around 1810, (Note: The exact year of the find is uncertain, as sources diverge towards a date variously given between 1809 and 1811.) a certain Joseph Anning discovered the first skull of the taxon on the cliffs of Black Ven, between the town of Lyme Regis and the village of Charmouth, two localities located in the county of Dorset, in the south of England. The remaining skeleton was later discovered by his sister, the now famous Mary Anning, in 1812. Although other ichthyosaur skeletons had been discovered locally and elsewhere, this particular specimen was the first to attract attention of the scientific community. After the discovery was announced in the press, the specimen was purchased by the lord of a local manor, Henry Hoste Henley, for a price of £23. Subsequently, Henley passed the fossils on to the naturalist William Bullock, who put them on display in the collections of his museum in London. In 1819, Bullock's own collection was sold to the Natural History Museum in London for a price of around £47. The specimen, now cataloged as NHMUK PV R 1158, is still currently housed at this museum, although the postcranial remains have since been lost.

Beginning in 1814, Sir Everard Home wrote a series of six papers for the Royal Society describing the specimen, initially identifying it as a crocodile. Perplexed as to the real nature of the fossil, Home kept changing his mind about its classification, thinking that it would be a fish, then as an animal sharing affinities with the platypus, which was then recently described at that time. Finally, in 1819, he thought that the fossil represented an animal that embodied an intermediate form between salamanders and lizards, which led him to erect the genus name Proteosaurus (originally written as Proteo-Saurus). In 1821, Henry De la Beche and his colleague William Daniel Conybeare made the very first scientific description of Ichthyosaurus, but did not name any species. Although being initially a nomen nudum, this generic name was already proposed in 1818 by Charles Konig, but was thus chosen as the definitive scientific name of this genus, Proteosaurus having since become a nomen oblitum. In their article, De la Beche and Conybeare refer several additional fossils discovered at Black Ven to this genus, also including the specimen originally described by Home, and finally identify it as a marine reptile. It was in 1822 that De la Beche named three species of Ichthyosaurus on the basis of several anatomical differences distinguishing the specimens, one of them being I. platyodon. He nevertheless announces that future descriptions will be done with the help of Conybeare. However, it was Conybeare himself who described the fossils the same year, attributing the largest specimens to I. platyodon, The specific name platyodon comes from the Ancient Greek πλατύς (platús, "flat", "broad"), and ὀδούς (odoús, "tooth"), all meaning "flat teeth", in reference to the rather distinctive dentition of this species.

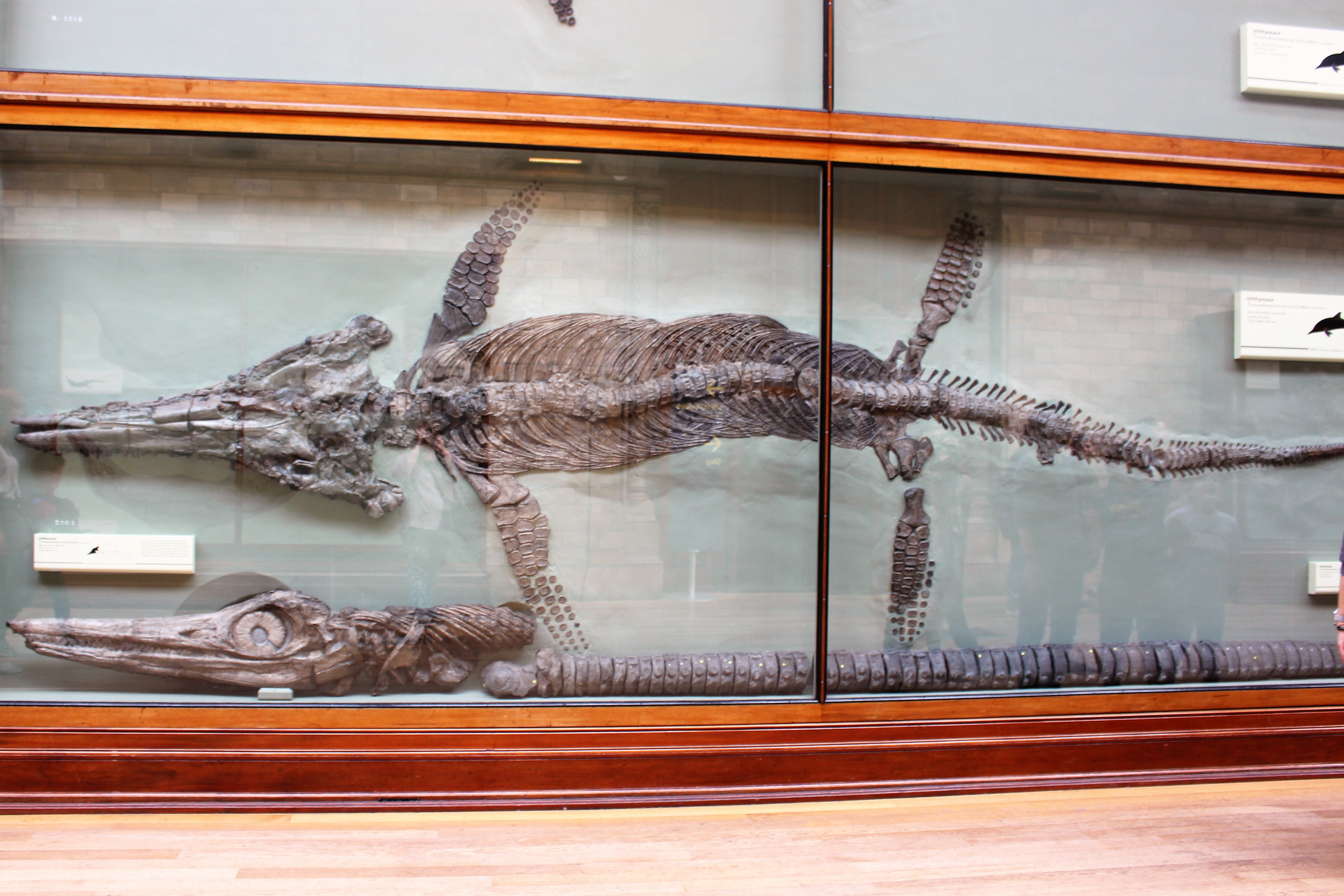
Various fossil specimens of T. platyodon on display at the Natural History Museum in London, England. In the center, the neotype skeleton (NHMUK PV OR 2003*), with the first specimen discovered (NHMUK PV R 1158) being present at the bottom left. The vertebrae at the bottom right come from another individual

In 1889, Henry Alleyne Nicholson and Richard Lydekker published a two-volume work that served as an introduction to the rules of paleontology for students. However, it is in the second volume that the two paleontologists gave a very detailed description of numerous prehistoric vertebrates, and during which the taxonomy of I. platyodon took another direction. Indeed, in his correction notes, Lydekker noticed that the teeth of I. platyodon had great differences from those of other previously recognized species of Ichthyosaurus and suggest that the latter could be the type species of a completely new genus of ichthyosaurs, which he named Temnodontosaurus. (Note: In the only detailed description of Temnodontosaurus by Lydekker, the taxon is nevertheless always referred to as I. platyodon.) This generic name is formed from the Ancient Greek τέμνω (temnō, "to cut"), ὀδούς (odoús, "tooth"), and σαῦρος (saûros, "lizard"), to give "cutting-tooth lizard". In a broad review of fossil vertebrates published in 1902, Oliver Perry Hay suggested that because the name Proteosaurus technically took precedence over Ichthyosaurus, he then displaced I. platyodon as the type species of that genus, then renamed Proteosaurus platyodon. In 1972, Christopher McGowan again used this combination proposed by Hay (although not mentioned), but the latter revised his judgment two years later, in 1974, in which he moved this species to Temnodontosaurus, as originally proposed by Lydekker. The holotype of Temnodontosaurus platyodon consisted of a single tooth which was preserved by the Geological Society of London. As the latter has since been noted as lost in 1960, McGowan designated specimen NHMUK PV OR 2003* as the neotype of this taxon. This specimen, already mentioned as a representative of the species by Richard Owen in 1881, was originally discovered and partly collected by Mary Anning in July 1832 in Lyme Regis. After the discovery, she sold the find to Thomas Hawkins, who himself sold the specimen to the Natural History Museum in London in 1834 for a price of £210.

=== Other species ===
==== Recognized species ====
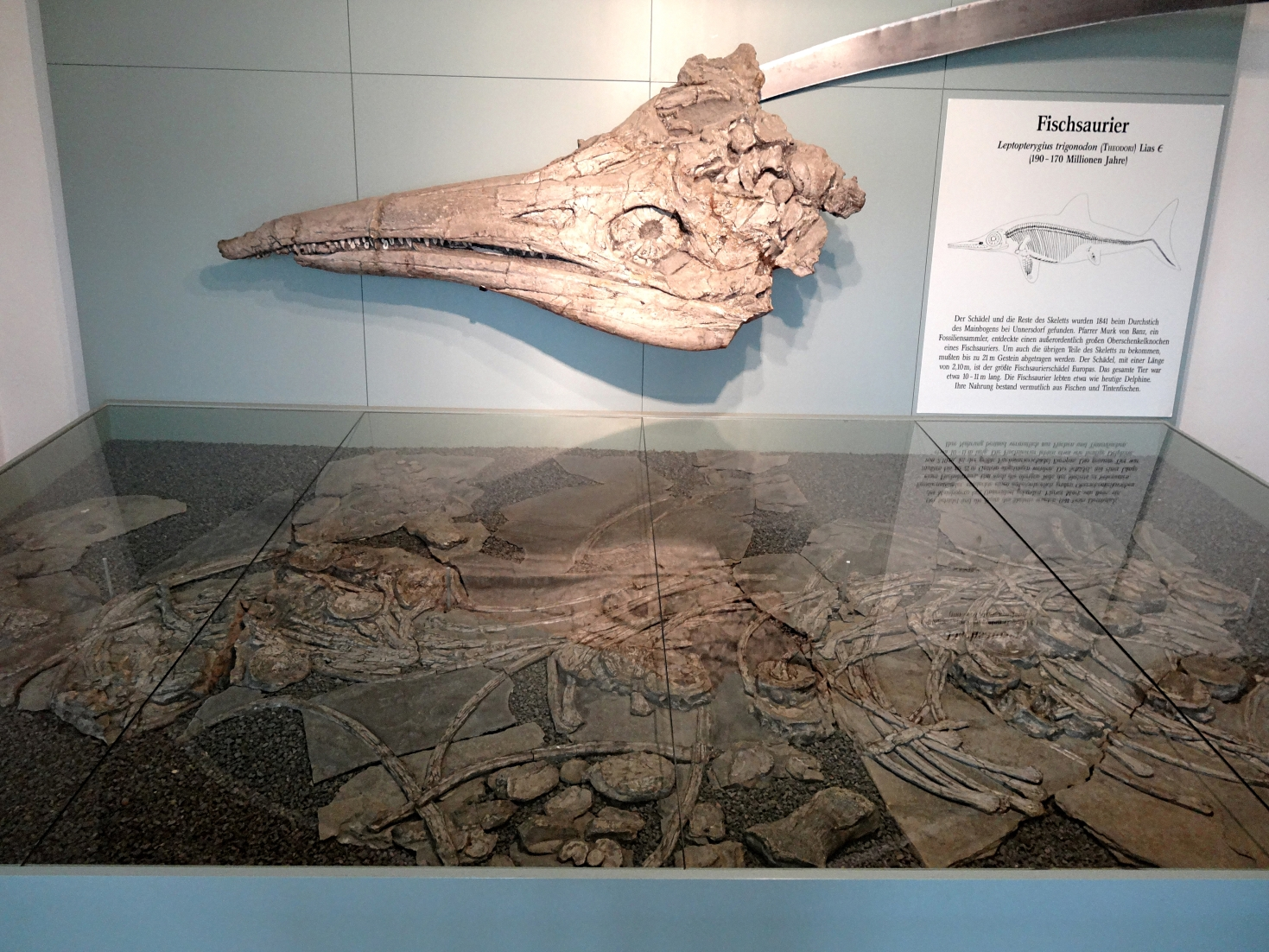
PB 1, the holotype specimen of T. trigonodon, at the Banz Abbey Museum, Bad Staffelstein, in Bavaria, Germany

In 1843, Carl von Theodori described a new species of Ichthyosaurus, I. trigonodon, which he described as "colossal", based on an imposing specimen comprising a complete skull and a partial postcranial skeleton discovered in the town of Holzmaden in the state of Baden-Württemberg, Germany. The specific name comes from Ancient Greek τρίγωνον (trígônon, "triangle") and ὀδούς (odoús, "tooth"), in reference to the dental crown which is visibly triangular in this species. In 1854, von Theodori made a much more in-depth description of the holotype specimen. In 1889, only some time before he established the genus Temnodontosaurus, Lydekker noted that the dentition of I. trigonodon was quite similar to that of I. platyodon. Based on these dental characteristics, he moved this species to the genus Temnodontosaurus the following year, consequently being renamed T. trigonodon. In 1931, Friedrich von Huene transferred this species to the genus Leptopterygius. (Note: Since a study carried out by McGowan in 1996, this taxon is today known as Leptonectes, Leptopterygius being an already preoccupied junior synonym of a genus of actinopterygians belonging to the family Gobiesocidae.) In 1998, Michael W. Maisch moved the species again to the genus Temnodontosaurus, and attributed to this taxon other, mostly very complete, specimens having been discovered in Germany and France. This classification has since been retained in subsequent works, to the point that a large specimen discovered in England in 2021, nicknamed as the 'Rutland Sea Dragon', was even considered as the first probable representative within this country. However, a 2023 morphological study conducted by Rebecca F. Bennion and colleagues shows that the holotype specimen differs in cranial and dental traits from other specimens since assigned to the species. The authors therefore suggest that a future re-evaluation is necessary for better a diagnosis of T. trigonodon.

In 1857, an almost complete skeleton of a large ichthyosaur was discovered north of Whitby, Yorkshire. The latter was also found near another skeleton, that of a pliosaur, which is today recognized as the holotype specimen of Rhomaleosaurus cramptoni. Shortly after its discovery, the ichthyosaurian skeleton was subsequently sent to the Yorkshire Museum, where it was cataloged as YORYM 497. The following year, 1858, Owen examined the specimen and classified it as distinct from I. platyodon, attributing it to a completely new species which he named I. crassimanus. However, the latter was never scientifically described by Owen, although it is briefly mentioned in a work by John Phillips and Robert Etheridge published in 1875. It was in 1876 that John Frederick Blake made the first scientific description of the animal, although he did so only very briefly. In 1889, Lydekker considered this species as a potential junior synonym of I. trigonodon, an opinion which was followed by numerous authors until around the beginning of the 20th century. In 1930, Sidney Melmore made the first in-depth description of I. crassimanus based on the holotype specimen, restoring the distinct status of the species. In his revision published in 1974, McGowan synonymized I. crassimanus with the proposed taxon Stenopterygius acutirostis, also attributing other specimens discovered in the original locality. In 2003, McGowan and Ryosuke Motani suggested that all specimens historically attributed to I. crassimanus appeared sufficiently different from T. platyodon and T. trigonodon to belong to a distinct species of the genus Temnodontosaurus, being renamed T. crassimanus. However, they note that further research could question its validity. Long remaining an under-analyzed taxon, it was in 2020 that Emily J. Swaby wrote a thesis considerably revising it. Contrary to the suggestion previously made by McGowan and Motani, Swaby maintains the attribution of this species to Temnodontosaurus. The descriptions of this same thesis were finally published the following year in a study co-authored with Daniel R. Lomax.

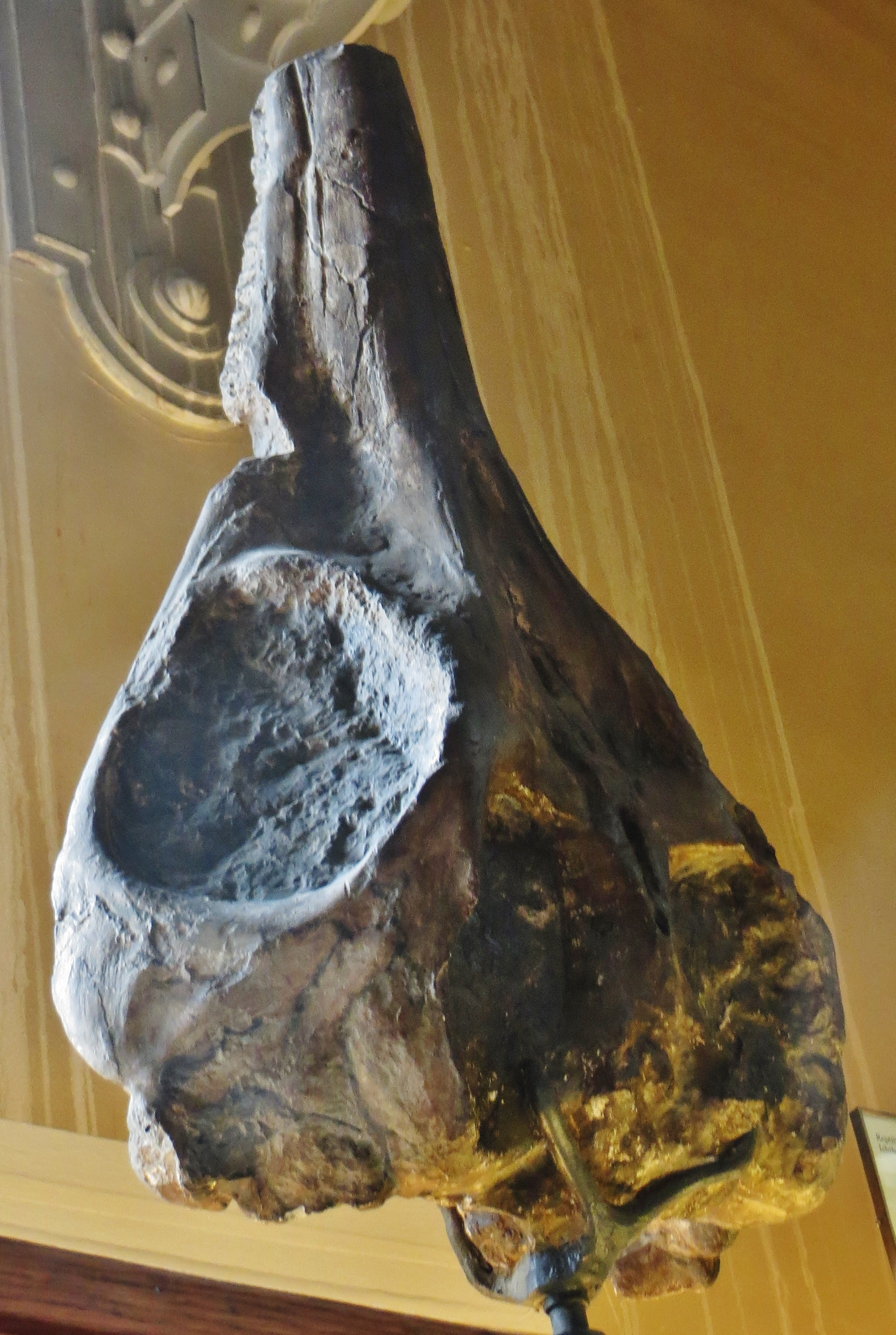
CAMSM J35176, the holotype skull of T. zetlandicus

In 1880, Harry Govier Seeley described the species I. zetlandicus on the basis of a well-preserved skull loaned by an Earl of Shetland (hence its name) around an unspecified date to the Sedgwick Museum of Earth Sciences in Cambridge. This skull, cataloged as CAMSM J35176, was discovered in the coasts of Whitby, near the locality where T. crassimanus was already discovered. In 1922, von Huene moved the species within Stenopterygius. In 1974, McGowan considered S. zetlandicus as a synonym of S. acutirostris, before this species was itself synonymized with T. acutirostris from 1997. In 2022, Antoine Laboury and colleagues reestablished the validity of the species by redescribing CAMSM J35176, but moved it to the genus Temnodontosaurus, being renamed T. zetlandicus. In their description, they attribute another specimen to the taxon, cataloged as MNHNL TU885, a partial skull which was originally discovered in Schouweiler, southern Luxembourg.

In 1931, von Huene described a new species of the genus Leptopterygius, L. nürtingensis, based on a skull and some postcranial remains of a single specimen discovered in a quarry in the town of Nürtingen (hence its name), Baden-Württemberg, Germany. This specimen, cataloged as SMNS 13488, is mentioned for the first time in a work by Eberhard Fraas published posthumously in 1919, in which the author considers it to be the representative of an undetermined species of Ichthyosaurus. In another work also published posthumously in 1926, Fraas attributed this specimen to a proposed new species which he named I. bellicosus. Fraas was initially expected to carry out the first scientific description of this taxon, but the latter's premature death in 1915 prevented this project from being achieved. Thus, in the absence of a scientific description, the name I. bellicosus is seen as a nomen nudum, and therefore does not have priority over L. nürtingensis. Although L. nürtingensis was only officially described in 1931 by von Huene, the taxon was already mentioned a year earlier by the same author in an article concerning the ribs of the holotype specimen, which have since been noted as lost. In 1939, Oskar Kuhn assimilated an incomplete specimen discovered in Aue-Fallstein, Lower Saxony, to this species. However, Kuhn did not present sufficient evidence to confirm his claims, and the specimen has since been viewed as indeterminate. In 1979, McGowan carried out a large revision of the ichthyosaurs known from Germany, in which he classified L. nürtingensis as a nomen dubium. In 1997, Maisch and Axel Hungerbühler formally criticized McGowan's view, given that the holotype specimen is preserved in an excellent state of conservation and is easily diagnosable. He then redescribed this specimen and considered it to be attributable to Temnodontosaurus. In their analysis, the authors change the typography of the species nürtingensis to nuertingensis, due to rule 32.C of the ICZN requiring it. The species is again considered a nomen dubium by McGowan and Motani in 2003, but its validity as well as its belonging to this genus is maintained in subsequent studies.

==== Dubious species ====
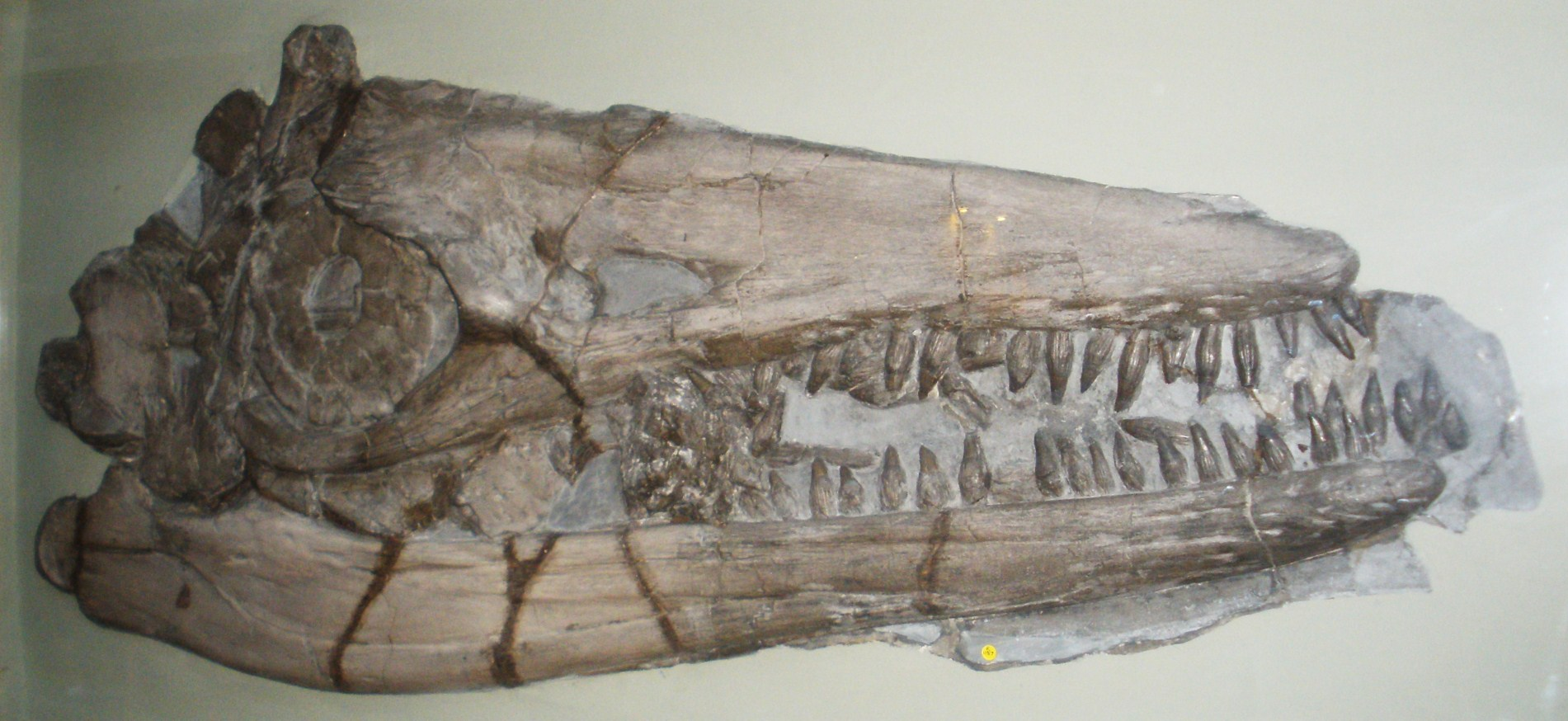
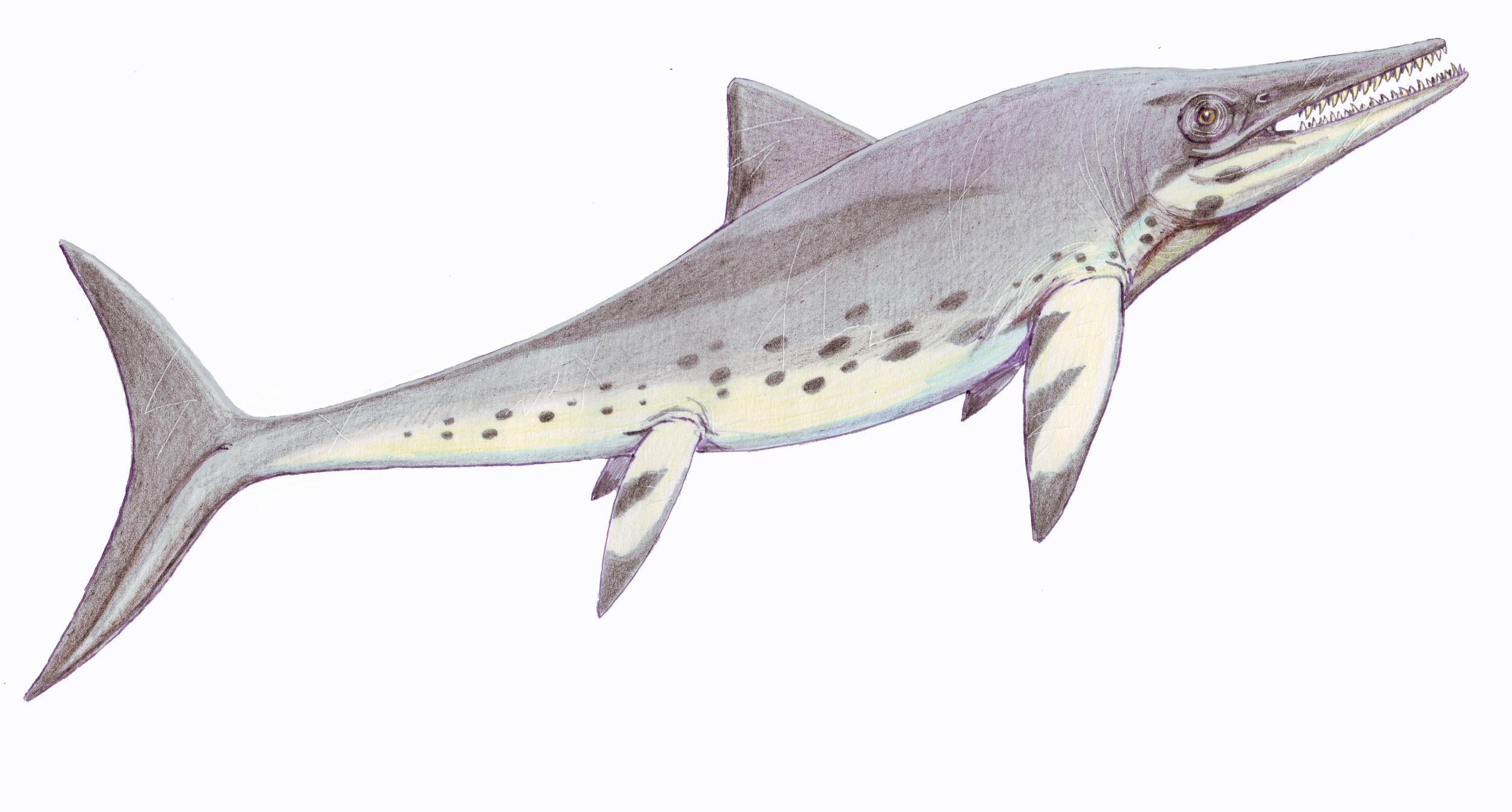
Holotype skull and life restoration of T. eurycephalus.

In 1881, Owen attributed a large isolated skull discovered at Lyme Regis, cataloged as NHMUK PV R1157, to the newly erected species of the genus Ichthyosaurus, I. breviceps. In 1922, von Huene moved this species to the genus Eurypterygius, a taxon which is itself recognized as a junior synonym of Ichthyosaurus. Although I. breviceps is still recognized as belonging to this genus, the large skull historically attributed to the species has large differences with the holotype specimen. Noting this, McGowan redescribed this specimen in more detail and made it the holotype of an entirely new species of Temnodontosaurus, T. eurycephalus. The specific name comes from the Ancient Greek ευρύς (eurús, "broad"), and κεφαλή (kephalế, "head"), all meaning "broad head", in reference to the cranial morphology of the taxon.

In 1984, an almost complete skeleton of a large ichthyosaur was discovered in the Lafarge quarries in the French commune of Belmont-d'Azergues, located near Lyon. Although the specimen is mentioned in a detailed biostratigraphic analysis of the Lafarge quarries published in 1991, it was in 2012 when the fossil, uncatalogued but stored in the Saint-Pierre-la-Palud local mining museum, was officially designated as the holotype of the new species T. azerguensis by Jeremy E. Martin and his colleagues. The specific name comes from the Azergues, a river located near the site of the discovery.

In 2014, British paleontologist Darren Naish expressed doubts in a blog in the journal Scientific American about the attribution of these two species to Temnodontosaurus, noting their large anatomical differences highlighting the need for a taxonomic revision of this genus. A similar observation is shared in the study describing T. zetlandicus in 2022, with the authors mentioning these two species as too phylogenetically unstable to be included in a monophyletic grouping of Temnodontosaurus.

=== Formerly assigned species ===
In 1840, Owen named the species I. acutirostris on the basis of a partial skeleton discovered near Whitby, now numbered NHMUK PV OR 14553. The holotype specimen was for a long time noted as lost, but this was only in 2002 when it was officially found, although some anatomical parts such as the snout are missing. Even before the specimen was found, some studies classified this species within the genus Temnodontosaurus, as Maisch and Hungerbühler did in 1997. However, Maisch reversed his decision in 2010, citing that numerous cranial features prove it is not part of the genus. Therefore, the author withdraws his attribution of this specimen to Temnodontosaurus and instead suggests that the latter would be the representative of a completely new genus. In 2022, Laboury and colleagues share the same conclusions and considers "I." acutirostris as a species inquirenda.

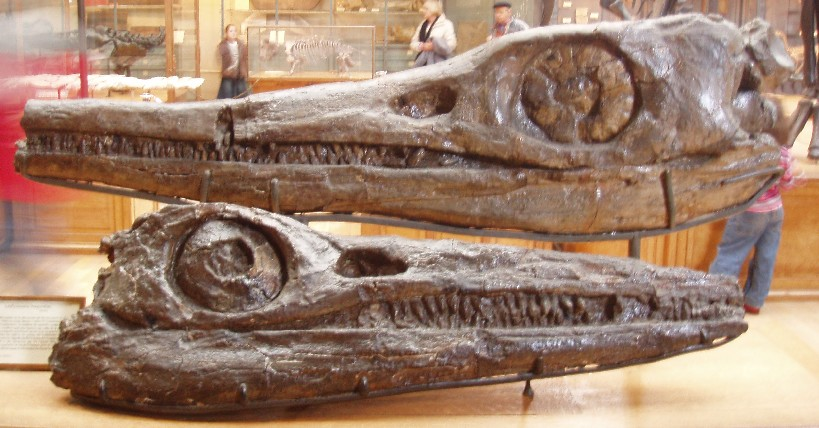
Skulls historically attributed to T. burgundiae (the holotype specimen being at the top), exhibited at the National Museum of Natural History in Paris, France.

In 1892, Albert Gaudry officially described a new species of Ichthyosaurus, I. burgundiae, on the basis of a specimen discovered in the quarries of the town of Sainte-Colombe, in Yonne, France. Even before the taxon was described by Gaudry, the specimen, being one of the largest ichthyosaurs known at the time, led to it being presented at the 1889 Paris Exposition, the same exhibition for which the Eiffel Tower was built. After the end of the exhibition, the specimen was subsequently donated to the National Museum of Natural History in Paris, joining its collection on November 12, 1889, where it is still exhibited to this day. Gaudry already proposed the name of I. burgundiae at the French Academy of Sciences in 1891, but it was not until the following year that he published the first formal description of the taxon. In 1996, McGowan attributed a number of specimens discovered in Germany to this species, but moved it there to the genus Temnodontosaurus. In 1998, Maisch compared these specimens to the holotype of T. trigonodon, and suggested synonymizing T. burgundiae with the latter. Maisch's opinion is followed by McGowan and Motani in 2003, considering T. burgundiae as a junior synonym of T. trigonodon, despite slight osteological differences. The synonymy is however based only on German specimens, a new examination of the holotype specimen discovered in Sainte-Colombe having never been carried out due to its questionable state of conservation.

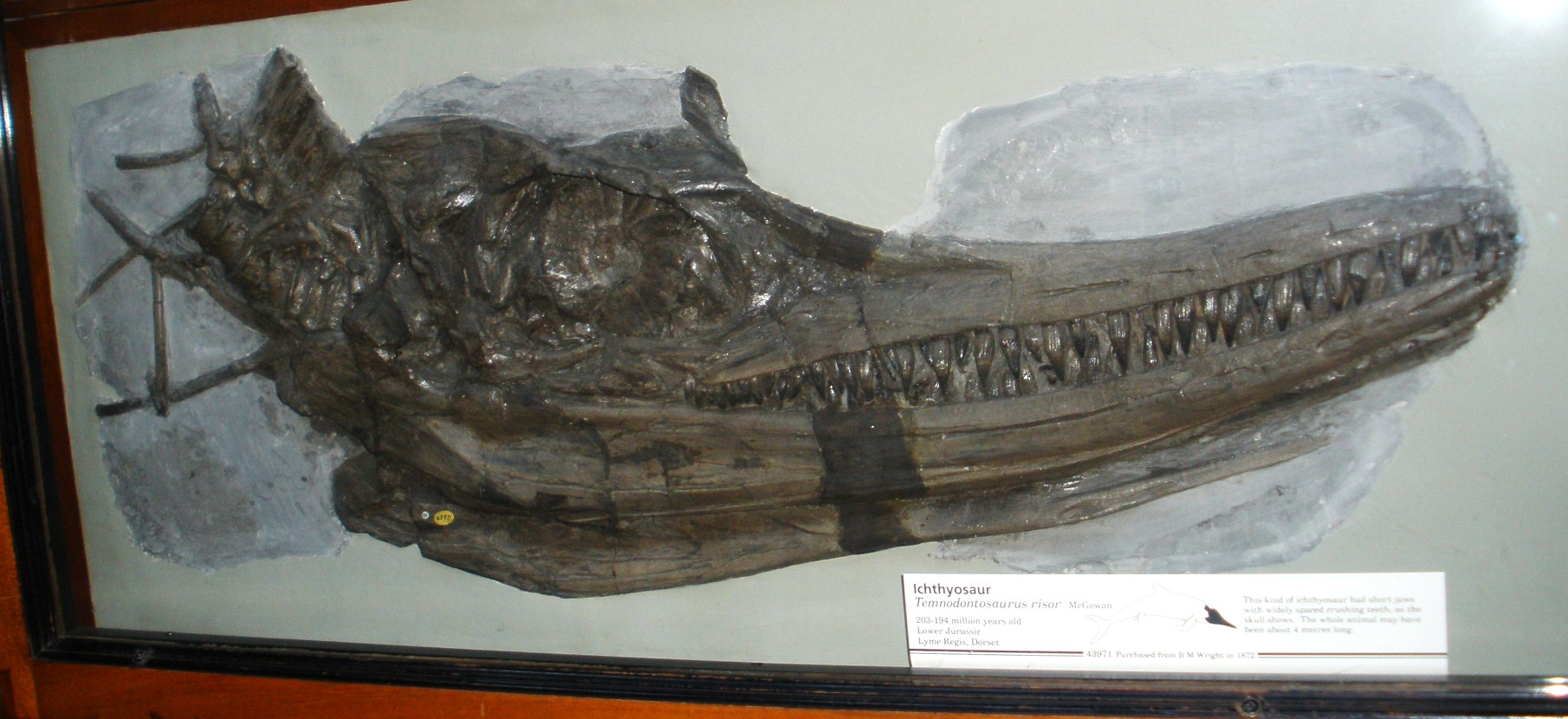
NHMUK PV R43971, the holotype skull of T. risor

In 1974, McGowan described an additional species of Temnodontosaurus, T. risor, based on three skulls discovered at Lyme Regis, designating NHMUK PV R43971 as the holotype specimen. The specific name of this taxon comes from the Latin Risor, meaning "mocker". In his description, he justifies the distinction of this species via the larger orbits, the smaller maxillae and the curved snout. In 1995, the same author carried out a more in-depth revision of the three specimens attributed to this taxon. He then discovered that the characteristics he had previously judged to be distinctive were in fact stages of growth, the three specimens representing juveniles of T. platyodon.

=== Early depictions ===
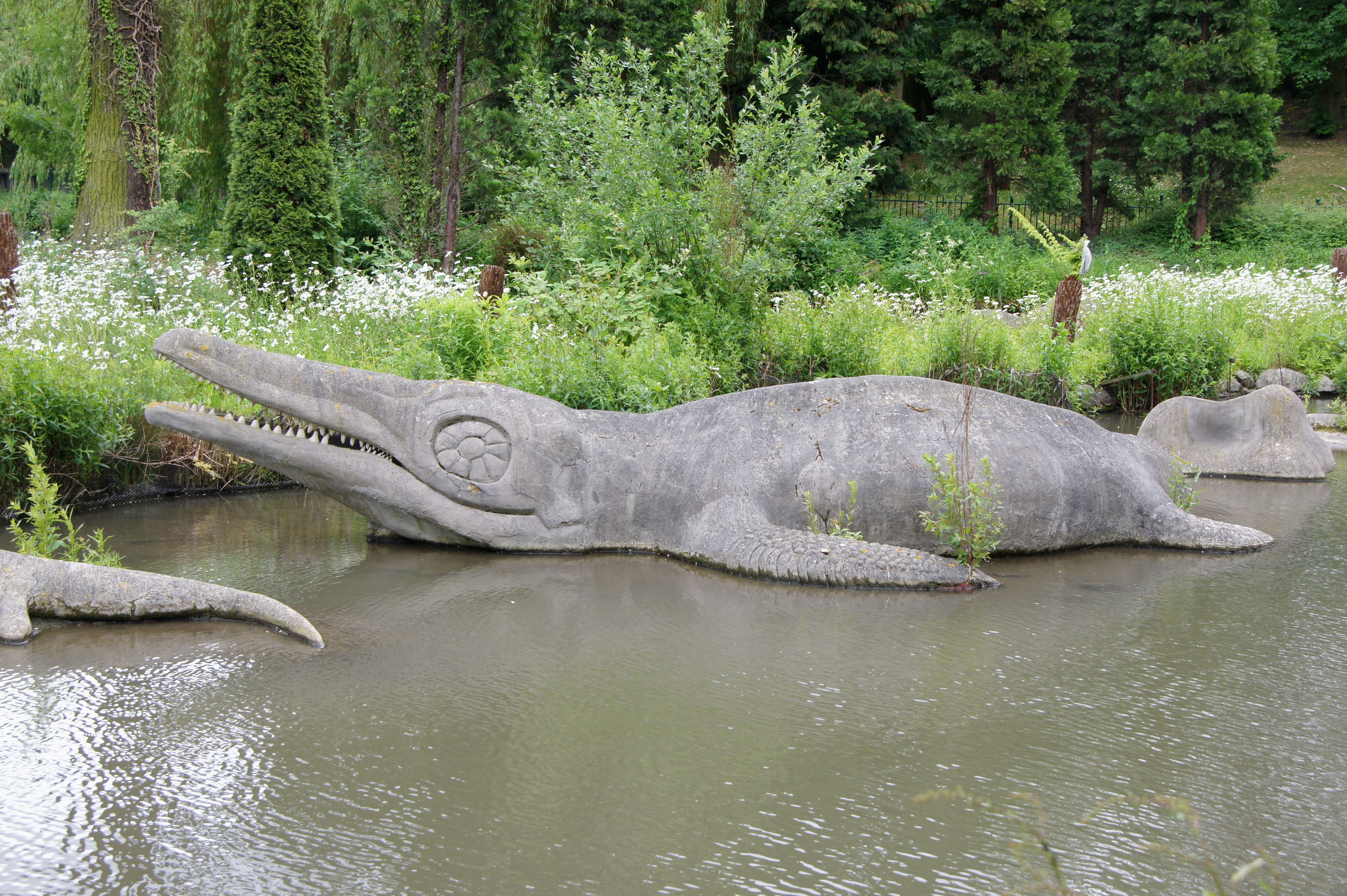
An 1854 depiction of Temnodontosaurus in Crystal Palace Park

One of the earliest representations of Temnodontosaurus in paleoart is a life-size concrete sculpture created by Benjamin Waterhouse Hawkins between 1852 and 1854, as part of the collection of sculptures of prehistoric animals on display at the Crystal Palace Park in London. It is one of the three ichthyosaur sculptures exhibited in the park, the other two representing Ichthyosaurus and Leptonectes. Although the park is known for its obsolete or even false reconstructions of extinct animals, the sculptures depicting ichthyosaurs have the most elements still recognized as valid. These recognized features include smooth, scaleless skin, a fin at the end of the tail, and large eyes. Hawkins also reconstructed the facial features of these three ichthyosaurs based on those of whales and dolphins, which is still recognized as reasonable given their strong morphological similarities. Discoveries and reconstructions subsequent to those at the Crystal Palace add to this the presence of a dorsal fin, a caudal fin with two crescent-shaped lobes as well as a reconstruction of the skin on the basis of most well-preserved fossils.

Many elements of these reconstructions still remain obsolete, such as the eyes and the flippers which are reconstructed by the shape of their bones, namely the scleral rings and the phalanges. Although Owen suggested the still viable hypothesis that the scleral rings served to protect the eye, it is highly unlikely that the eyes of ichthyosaurs would have looked as shown in the carvings, given that the scleral rings are located under the eyelids. The flippers were faithfully reconstructed by Hawkins based on Owen's misinterpretation of the phalanges as scales. The park's ichthyosaurs are depicted as crawling in shallow water, reflecting the ancient hypothesis that they came to the shores to sleep or to breed. Additionally, their tails are shown to be eel-like and having a great degree of flexibility. However, the three ichthyosaurs actually had a fairly variable degree of flexibility. Two of the three taxa shown, i. e. Temnodontosaurus and Leptonectes, were found to have much more flexible tails than that of Ichthyosaurus, the latter having a tuna-like morphology. This way of reconstructing the tail of ichthyosaurs as similar to those of eels is not an error specific to Hawkins, being the norm in reconstructions dating from the 19th century.

== Description ==
Temnodontosaurus, like other ichthyosaurs, had a long, thin snout, large eye sockets, and a tail fluke that was supported by vertebrae in the lower half. Ichthyosaurs were superficially similar to dolphins and had flippers rather than legs, and most (except for early species) had dorsal fins. Although the full body colour of Temnodontosaurus is unknown, at least some ichthyosaurs may have been uniformly dark-coloured in life, which is evidenced by the discovery of high concentrations of eumelanin pigments in the preserved skin of an early ichthyosaur fossil, and a specimen of T. trigonodon had similarly dark coloration on at least the forefins.

=== Size ===
Temnodontosaurus is one of the largest ichthyosaurs identified to date, although the species which belong to it are not as imposing as Triassic forms like Shonisaurus, Himalayasaurus, Cymbospondylus or Ichthyotitan. It nevertheless represents the largest known ichthyosaur of the parvipelvian group. Based on different specimens, the species T. platyodon, T. trigonodon and T. crassimanus have body sizes estimated to be around 9 m (30 ft) in length. The 'Rutland Sea Dragon', a possible specimen of T. trigonodon discovered in January 2021 in the Rutland Water, near Oakham, is estimated to be slightly over 10 m (33 ft) long. Skull size varies between these three species. The largest known skulls of T. trigonodon and T. platyodon are 1.8 m (5 ft 11 in) to 1.9 m (6 ft 3 in) long, respectively. Although incomplete, the holotype specimen of T. crassimanus would have had a skull estimated to be around 1 m (3 ft 3 in) long. No body length estimates for T. zetlandicus and T. nuertingensis have currently been given. However, the measurement of their skull, reaching respectively 1 to 1.3 m (3 ft 3 in to 4 ft 3 in) in length, suggests that they are smaller representatives when compared to the three species previously mentioned.

More isolated bones suggest that Temnodontosaurus may have grown to an even larger size. In his extensive revision published in 1922, von Huene described a series of very imposing vertebrae from the collections of the Banz Abbey Museum, Germany, the largest of them measuring 22 cm (8.7 in) high. In 1996, McGowan nominally assigned the specimen to Temnodontosaurus, although without specific assignment. Based on SMNS 50000, a nearly complete skeleton of T. trigonodon, the author estimated the size of Banz's specimen at 16 m (52 ft) long, as Huene initially suggested. However, this estimate turned out to be exaggerated, as specimen SMNS 50000 is shorter than what had been assumed during the formulation of the estimate.

=== Morphology ===
The forefins and hindfins of Temnodontosaurus were of roughly the same length and were rather narrow and elongated. This characteristic is unlike other post-Triassic ichthyosaurs such as the thunnosaurians, which had forefins at least twice the length of their hindfins. Furthermore, the genus differed from ichthyosaurs such as Ichthyosaurus in possessing an unreduced, tripartite pelvic girdle and having only three primary digits with one postaxial accessory digit. Like other ichthyosaurs, the fins exhibited strong hyperphalangy (where the "fingers" consist of many more phalanges than in other vertebrates). As in other post-Triassic ichthyosaurs, the tail provided the main propulsive force for aquatic locomotion, although it had a weak tail bend at an angle of less than 35°; its caudal fin has variously been described as either lunate or semi-lunate. This fin was made of two lobes, in which the lower lobe was skeletally supported by vertebrae whereas the upper lobe had no bony support. The proximal elements of the fin formed a mosaic pattern, while the more distal elements were relatively round. It also had a triangular dorsal fin and had two notches on the fin's anterior margin; the paired fins were used to steer and stabilize the animal while swimming, instead of being used for paddling or other propulsive methods. It had roughly less than 90 vertebrae, and the vertebral axis and atlas were fused together, serving as stabilization during swimming. T. trigonodon possessed unicipital ribs near the sacral region and the bicipital ribs more anteriorly, which helped to increase flexibility while swimming.

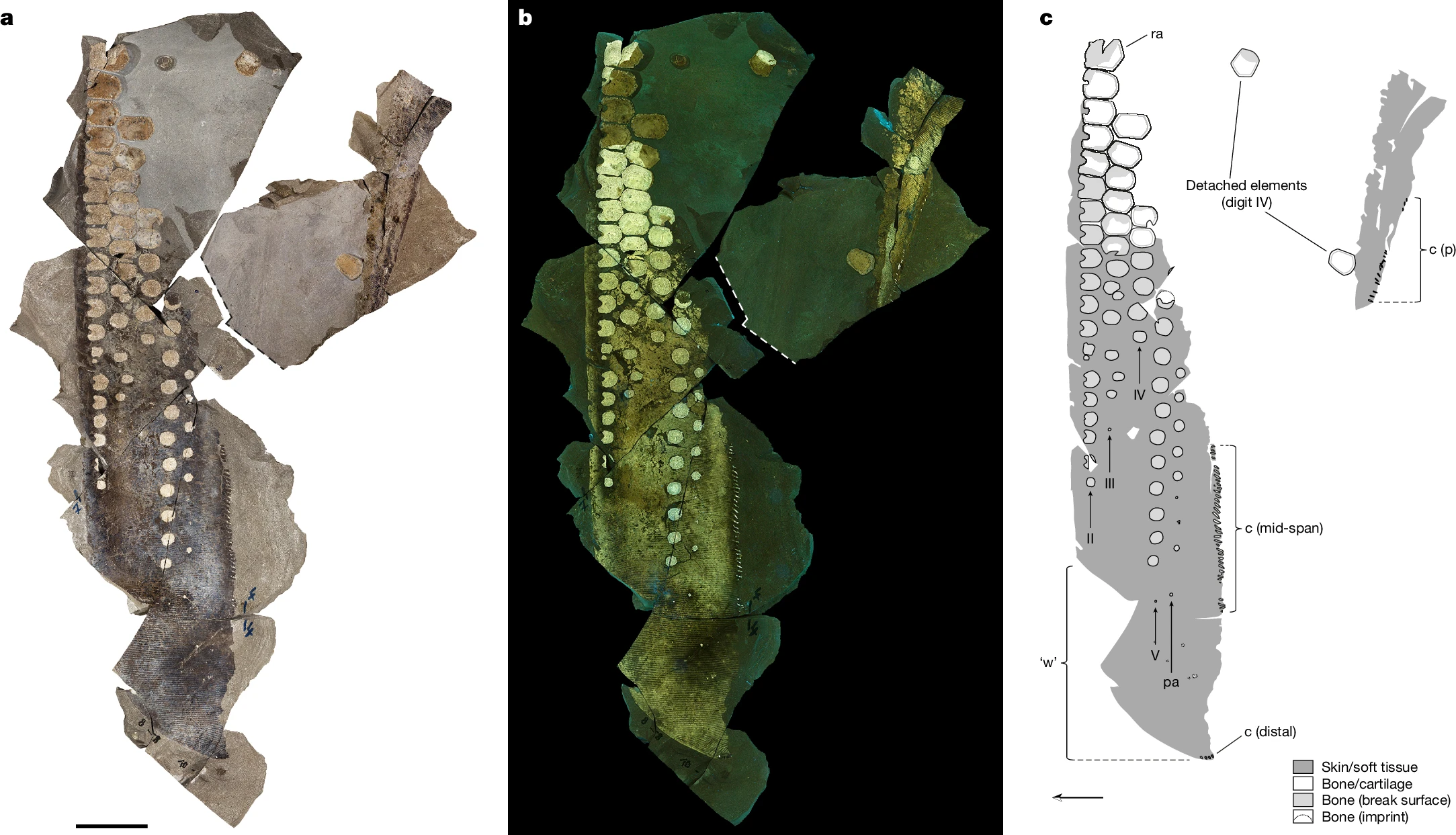
Front flipper (forefin) of T. trigonodon with preserved soft tissue impressions

The preserved soft tissues on a 1 m (3.3 ft) long forefin specimen (SSN8DOR11) from the Toarcian age Posidonia Shale of Germany revealed the presence of previously unknown structures, referred to as "chondroderms" by Lindgren et al. (2025), which would have given the flipper a serrated appearance in life. These chondroderms likely served as "noise-cancelling" structures, which may have improved Temnodontosaurus' ability to perform a stealthy approach while hunting under the cover of darkness. Preserved eumelanin (pigments responsible for black layer of skin) and "evenly spaced stripes" are also present across the forefin, and the tip of the fin likely acted as a "flexible winglet".

Like other ichthyosaurs, Temnodontosaurus likely had high visual capacity and used vision as its primary sense while hunting. Species of Temnodontosaurus had the largest eyes of any ichthyosaur and of any animal measured. The largest eyes measured belonged to the species T. platyodon. Despite the enormous size of its eyes, Temnodontosaurus had blind spots directly above its head due to the angle at which its eyes were pointed. The eyes of Temnodontosaurus had scleral rings, hypothesized to have provided rigidity in the eyes. The scleral rings of T. platyodon were at least 25 cm (9.8 in) in diameter.

The head of Temnodontosaurus had a long robust snout with an antorbital constriction. It also had an elongated maxilla, a long cheek region, and a long postorbital segment. The carotid foramen in the basisphenoid in the skull was paired and was separated by the parasphenoid. The parasphenoid had a processus cultriformis. The skull of T. platyodon measured about 1.5 m (4.9 ft) long, while T. eurycephalus had a shorter rostrum and a deeper skull compared to other species, perhaps improving its ability to crush prey. T. platyodon and T. trigadon had a very long snout that was slightly curved on its dorsal side and ventrally curved, respectively. It also had many pointed conical teeth that were set in continuous grooves, rather than having individual sockets. This form of tooth implantation is known as aulacodonty. Its teeth typically had two or three carinae; notably, T. eurycephalus possessed bulbous roots, while T. nuertingensis had no canine or bulbous roots. The bicarinate teeth of T. platyodon were unusually resistant to breakage relative to the conical, recurved teeth possessed by other predatory marine reptiles.

== Classification ==
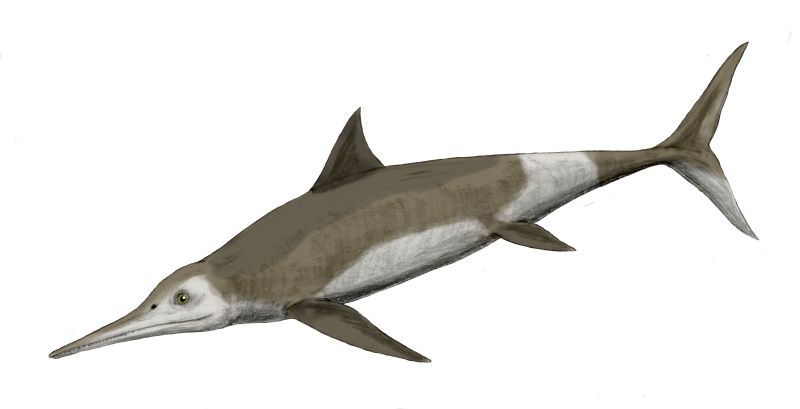
Life restoration of T. platyodon

The majority of the currently recognized species of Temnodontosaurus were originally described as species of Ichthyosaurus, before the type species T. platyodon was moved to a separate genus in 1889 by Lydekker. In 1974, McGowan established the family Temnodontosauridae, to which it is still the only genus recognized. Temnodontosaurus is one of the most basal post-Triassic ichthyosaurs. In the first major phylogenetic revision of ichthyosaurs, carried out in 1999 by Motani, Temnodontosaurus is placed in the Parvipelvia clade. It is this specific group of ichthyosaurs that includes all of the "fish-shaped" representatives, with the more basal ichthyosaurs having more elongated body plans. In 2000, Paul Martin Sander erected a new clade within this subgroup, which he named Neoichthyosauria. This clade notably brings together Temnodontosaurus, Suevoleviathan, Leptonectidae and Thunnosauria, the latter including all of the ichthyosaurs that lived until the Cretaceous. For reasons of classification convenience, McGowan and Motani established the superfamily Temnodontosauroidea in 2003. In their phylogenetic revision published in 2016, Ji and colleagues classify Leptonectidae within this proposed superfamily, recovering Temnodontosaurus as the latter's sister taxon. However, other classifications clearly do not follow this model, preferring to stick to the definition of Neoichthyosauria as previously mentioned.

For several decades, Temnodontosaurus was a taxon whose monophyly was rarely questioned. The current diagnostic of the genus was first established in the revision made by McGowan in 1974 based on some cranial and postcranial characteristics. However, as the cranial features of aquatic tetrapods are strongly influenced by convergent evolution, this does not seem ideal for establishing a stable taxonomy. Thus, since the late 1990s, many authors, including McGowan himself, have advocated that Temnodontosaurus needs to be revised. Additionally, numerous recent phylogenetic analyzes showing that the genus as currently defined is polyphyletic, with some historically assigned species being unrelated each other. Thus, pending future studies, Temnodontosaurus is currently seen as a wastebasket taxon including some large, more or less related neoichthyosaurians dating from the Lower Jurassic. In the last major study investigating the taxonomy of this genus, having been carried out by Laboury et al. (2022), only four species appear to form a monophyletic grouping, namely T. platyodon, T. trigonodon, T. zetlandicus and T. nuertingensis.

Below, a simplified cladogram based on a Bayesian analysis conducted by Laboury et al. (2022):

- Parvipelvia
  - Hudsonelpidia brevirostris
  - - Macgowania janiceps
    - - Ichthyosauridae
      - - - - - Temnodontosaurus azerguensis
              - Leptonectidae
            - - - Temnodontosaurus crassimanus
                - - - Suevoleviathan integer
                    - Temnodontosaurus eurycephalus
                  - - Temnodontosaurus nuertigensis
                    - - Temnodontosaurus zetlandicus
                      - - Temnodontosaurus platyodon
                        - Temnodontosaurus trigonodon
        - - - Malawania anachronus
            - Hauffiopteryx
          - Baracromia

== Paleobiology ==
With their dolphin-like bodies, ichthyosaurs were better adapted to their aquatic environment than any other group of marine reptiles. They were viviparous that gave birth to live young and were likely incapable of leaving the water. As homeotherms ("warm-blooded") with high metabolic rates, ichthyosaurs would have been active swimmers. Jurassic and Cretaceous ichthyosaurs, including Temnodontosaurus, had evolved a thunniform method of swimming rather than the anguilliform (undulating or eel-like) methods of earlier species. Temnodontosaurus, particularly the species T. trigonodon, is quite flexible in morphology for a parvipelvian, using its imposing flippers to maneuver under water.

Ichthyosaurs have the largest eyes of any known vertebrates, with Temnodontosaurus having the largest identified. The scleral rings in their eyes would have served to resist aquatic pressures. The eyes of ichthyosaurs like those of Temnodontosaurus would have a great visual capacity via the high number of photoreceptor cells. In addition to good eyesight, the enlarged olfactory region of the brain indicates that ichthyosaurs had a sensitive sense of smell.

=== Diet and feeding ===
Paleontologists generally agree that Temnodontosaurus was likely an active predator of a variety of other marine animals. Fauna hunted by Temnodontosaurus include bony fish, cephalopods, and aquatic reptiles, including even other ichthyosaurs. The skeletal anatomy of Temnodontosaurus suggests that it may have been an ambush predator. A particular skeleton of T. trigonodon (SMNS 50000) preserves in its stomach the remains of three juvenile Stenopterygius accompanied by a large number of cephalopod hooks. This proves that the animal was indeed an apex predator, but its diet consisted mainly of molluscs, with the large number of undigested hooks being compressed into a large gastric mass. Bromalites attributed to T. trigonodon suggest that it specifically targeted neonatal and juvenile Stenopterygius when hunting. Isolated gastroliths have also been reported in a specimen assigned to T. cf. trigondon, likely representing an incidental consumption.

=== Paleopathology ===
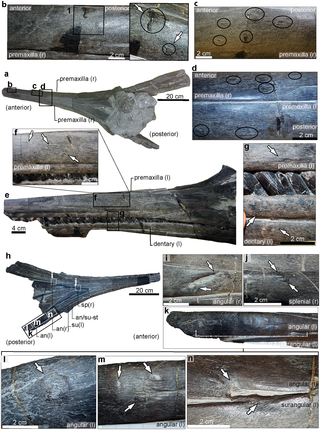
Multi-angle view of the holotype skull of T. nuertingensis (SMNS 13488), showing injuries.

There is fossil evidence that Temnodontosaurus engaged in aggressive combat, possibly with other members of its own genus. Several specimens exhibit healed traumatic injuries that were likely inflicted by other large marine reptiles. A particular specimen of T. trigonodon (SMNS 15950) exhibits ten roughly circular areas separated by only a few centimeters, suggesting that it was bitten by a large marine reptile with a long rostrum. The size and location of these injuries suggest that it was either attacked by another T. trigonodon or by a thalattosuchian similar to the contemporary Steneosaurus. Two other specimens, including the holotype of T. nuertingensis, exhibit deep wounds in the most posterior part of the mandible. Both specimens also exhibit healed wounds ventral to the splenial bone, in the mandibular symphysis. These injuries, combined with the size of the teeth of the animals potentially responsible for them, suggest that the tissues of the mandible of Temnodontosaurus would have been very thin.

== Paleoecology ==
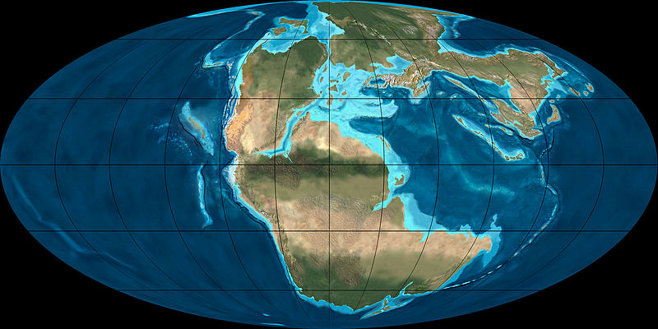
Map of the world during the Early Jurassic, at around 195 million years ago

=== Western Europe ===
In Europe, Temnodontosaurus is mainly known from fossils dating from the various stages of the Lower Jurassic of England, Germany, France and Luxembourg, with nevertheless some more or less fragmentary specimens having been reported in Arlon, Belgium, in Italy, and in Basel, Switzerland.

=== Chile ===
While Temnodontosaurus was historically known only from Europe, a fragmentary specimen was discovered in 1988 in the Atacama Desert, Chile. This specimen, consisting of fragmentary remains of the jaws and catalogued since as SGO.PV.324, was later rediscovered in 2016 in the collections of the National Museum of Natural History of Chile in Santiago, and first described in 2020. It comes more precisely from the volcanic beds of the La Negra Formation, dating from the Early Jurassic. The presence of ammonites potentially belonging to the genera Arnioceras and Paracoronicera indicates that the formation probably dates from the Sinemurian. The fossil record of vertebrates discovered in what is now northern Chile is currently very thin, but remains quite similar to that found in Europe. At that time, northern Chile was submerged by the southeastern part of the ancient superocean Panthalassa. Among the vertebrates identified are leptolepids, actinopterygians already present in Europe. Apart from Temnodontosaurus itself, the marine reptiles identified include thalattosuchians and undetermined plesiosaurs. The presence of these taxa in northern Chile could be explained by an interfaunal exchange between Tethys and Panthalassa, although other evidence suggesting this remains thin.

== See also ==
- List of ichthyosaurs
- Timeline of ichthyosaur research
