= Fernatator =

Fernatator Temporal range: Early Jurassic, Pliensbachian

Scientific classification
- Kingdom: Animalia
- Phylum: Chordata
- Class: Reptilia
- Order: †Ichthyosauria
- Node: †Parvipelvia
- Family: †incertae sedis
- Genus: †Fernatator; Massare et al., 2025
- Species: †F. prenticei

Binomial name
- †Fernatator prenticei Massare et al., 2025

Genus of ichthyosaur

Fernatator (meaning "Fernie swimmer") is an extinct genus of parvipelvian ichthyosaur which lived in what is now British Columbia, Canada during the Pliensbachian stage of the Early Jurassic. It contains one species, Fernatator prenticei, representing the most complete ichthyosaur known from the Early Jurassic of North America.

== Discovery and naming ==
The Fernatator fossil material was discovered by Tom Prentice in 1916 from the Fernie Formation near Fernie, British Columbia. The partial, articulated skeleton, catalogued as CMNFV 40398, was crated and reported by American paleontologist Charles Mortram Sternberg in 1931, and shipped to the Canadian Museum of Nature. While the exact location of the original site was never recorded, Robert J. Morris rediscovered the site in the early 1990s, which occurs on the east bank of the Elk River. Based on regional stratigraphy and ammonite biostratigraphy, the original site is concluded to be the lower part of the Fernie Formation, most likely corresponding to the Pliensbachian stage of the Early Jurassic.

In 2025, Judy A. Massare and colleagues described CMNFV 40398 as the holotype of a new genus and species of ichthyosaur, Fernatator prenticei. The generic name combines the word "Fern", referring to the town of Fernie and the Fernie Formation where the holotype was discovered, and natator, meaning "swimmer" in Latin. The specific name honours Tom Prentice who discovered the specimen in 1916.

== Description ==
Fernatator is a moderately-sized ichthyosaur. The preserved length of the skeleton measures 2.8 metres (9.2 ft), with the complete length estimated around 3–4 metres (9.8–13.1 ft). The panel-mounted type specimen is poorly preserved, with only the left side of the skeleton being visible. The skull is extremely crushed on the dorsal side and partially smoothed over with plaster. The specimen probably belongs an ontogenetically mature individual based on the scleral ring filling half of the orbit area.

The features of its skull and coracoid suggest affinities with other Early Jurassic ichthyosaurs including the coeval ichthyosaur genera Ichthyosaurus and Temnodontosaurus. While it shares several features with other known genera, the authors considered that the specimen belongs to a distinct genus and species, in spite of its poor skeletal preservation causing difficulty in morphological interpretation.

== Paleoenvironment ==
Fernatator shared its environment with another type of ichthyosaur from the same formation, as evidenced by the specimen CMNFV 9896 which was tentatively identified as Ichthyosaurus by Christopher McGowan in 1978. Ammonites associated with the Fernatator holotype include Acanthopleuroceras and Pimelites, indicative of the Pliensbachian Ibex Zone.
