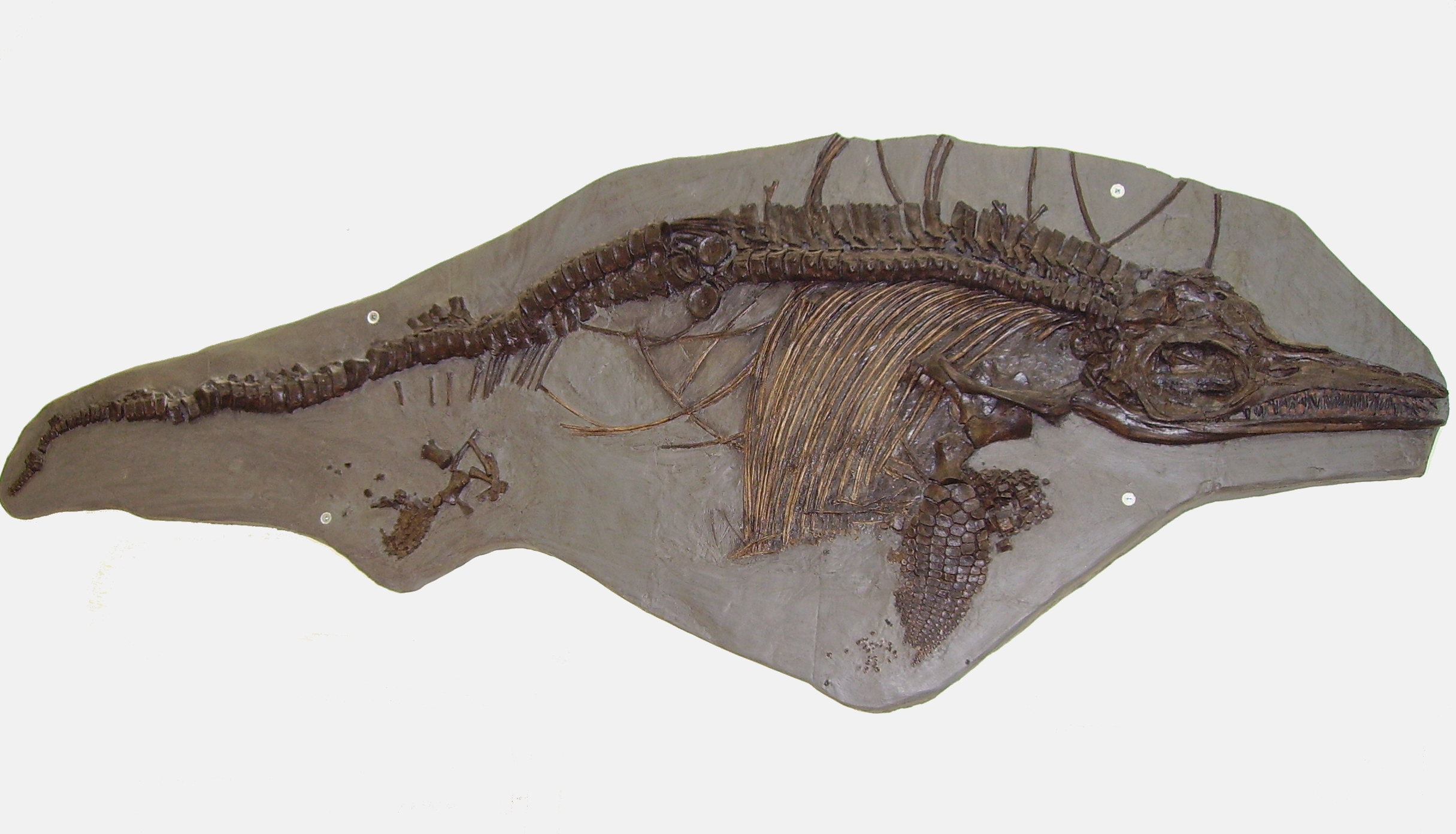
- Ichthyosaurus breviceps fossil

Scientific classification
- Domain: Eukaryota
- Kingdom: Animalia
- Phylum: Chordata
- Class: Reptilia
- Order: †Ichthyosauria
- Clade: †Euichthyosauria
- Node: †Parvipelvia; Motani, 1999

Subgroups
- †Fernatator; †Hudsonelpidia; †Macgowania; †Neoichthyosauria; †Dearcmhara; †Hauffiopteryx; †Suevoleviathan; †Temnodontosaurus; †Leptonectidae; †Thunnosauria

= Parvipelvia =

Parvipelvia Temporal range: Norian–Cenomanian ~210–93.5 Ma

Extinct clade of reptiles

Parvipelvia (Latin for "little pelvis" - parvus meaning "little" and pelvis meaning "pelvis") is an extinct clade of euichthyosaur ichthyosaurs that existed from the Late Triassic to the early Late Cretaceous (middle Norian to Cenomanian) of Asia, Australia, Europe, North America and South America. Named by Ryosuke Motani, in 1999, it contains the basal taxa like Macgowania and Hudsonelpidia. Maisch and Matzke (2000) found in their analysis seven synapomorphies that support Parvipelvia. They also found 10 synapomorphies that support the existence of post-Triassic clade of ichthyosaurs (all parvipelvians excluding Macgowania and Hudsonelpidia), for which the name Neoichthyosauria was found to be available. Parvipelvians were the only ichthyosaurs to survive the Triassic-Jurassic extinction event.

== Phylogeny ==
Parvipelvia is a node-based taxon defined in 1999 as "the last common ancestor of Hudsonelpidia, Macgowania, Ichthyosaurus and all of its descendants". Maisch and Matzke (2000) also defined Neoichthyosauria which is a node-based taxon originally named by P. Martin Sander in 2000, as "the last common ancestor of Temnodontosaurus trigonodon and Ophthalmosaurus icenicus and all of its descendants". The cladograms below follows Motani (1999) and Maisch and Matzke (2000).

- Parvipelvia
  - Macgowania
  - - Hudsonelpidia
    - - Suevoleviathan
      - Neoichthyosauria (by definition)
        - Eurhinosauria
        - Temnodontosaurus
        - Thunnosauria

- Parvipelvia
  - Macgowania
  - Hudsonelpidia
  - Neoichthyosauria
    - Temnodontosaurus
    - - Leptopterygiidae
      - - Suevoleviathan
        - Thunnosauria
