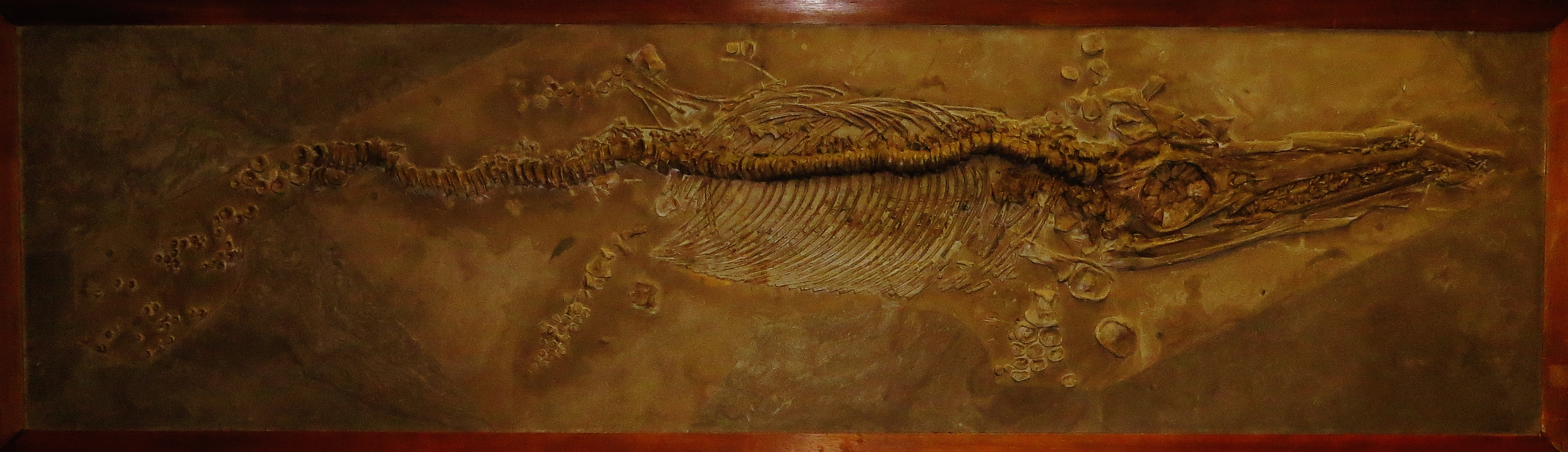
- Fossil of Suevoleviathan integer

Scientific classification
- Kingdom: Animalia
- Phylum: Chordata
- Class: Reptilia
- Order: †Ichthyosauria
- Node: †Parvipelvia
- Family: †Suevoleviathanidae; Maisch, 2001
- Genus: †Suevoleviathan; Maisch, 1998

Species
- Suevoleviathan disinteger (Huene, 1926) (type); Suevoleviathan integer (Bronn, 1844)

= Suevoleviathan =

Suevoleviathan Temporal range: Lower Jurassic, 183.0–182.0 Ma

Extinct genus of reptiles

Suevoleviathan is an extinct genus of primitive ichthyosaur found in the Early Jurassic (Toarcian) of Holzmaden, Germany.

== Taxonomy ==
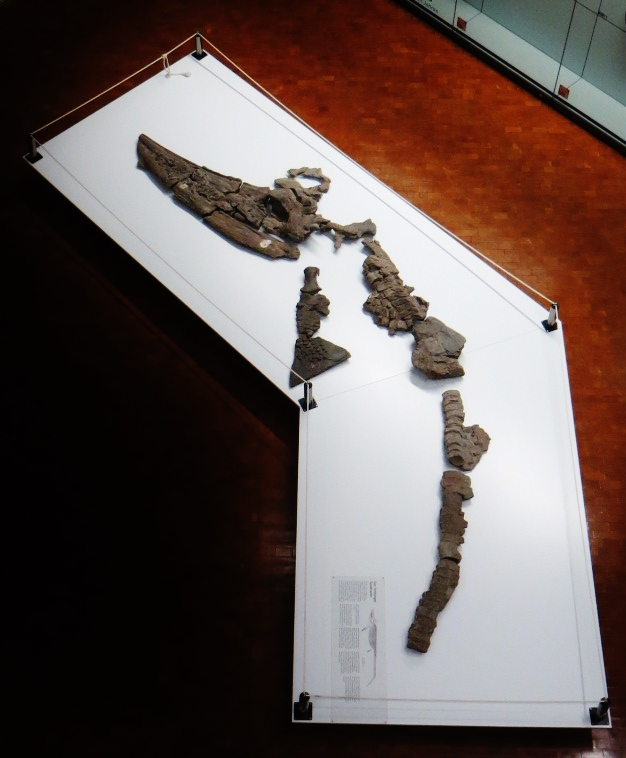
Fossil

The genus was named in 1998 by Michael Maisch for Leptopterygius disinteger and Ichthyosaurus integer, both found in the Toarcian-age Posidonia Shale of Holzmaden. The generic name means "Swabian Leviathan". The type species is Leptopterygius disinteger Huene 1926. Ichthyosaurus integer Bronn 1844 was also reassigned to the genus by Maisch to create the new combination Suevoleviathan integer.

Based on the relocation of the holotype of Suevoleviathan integer and an updated description of the specimen, Maxwell (2018) concluded that the two Suevoleviathan species are growth stages of the same species, meaning that S. integer has priority and becomes the epithet of the Suevoleviathan type species. However, in 2020, Maisch disagreed after reassessing a specimen he tentatively assigned to S. integer. This specimen differed from S. disinteger in multiple features, especially in the postcranial skeleton. While he resultingly treated S. integer as a valid, he nevertheless considered it a metaspecies due to the incompleteness of its holotype, which does not preserve important characters for specific assignment.

== Description ==
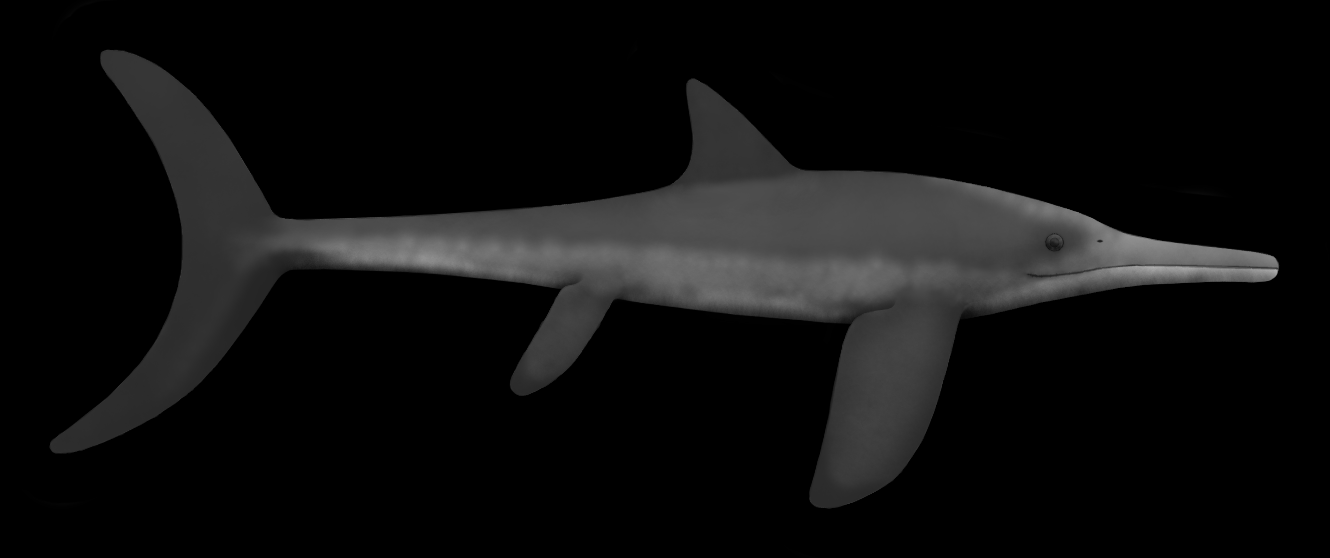
Life restoration of S. disinteger

Suevoleviathan was a large ichthyosaur about 4 metres (13 ft) long. The skull is low, orbit medium-sized, dorsal profile of skull only weakly concave; premaxilla and dentary with well developed grooves extending in an alternating fashion from the fossa praemaxillaris and fossa dentalis; maxilla short anteriorly, not reaching far beyond external naris, taking part in the formation of external naris and ventral orbital margin, separating lacrimal and jugal; jugal robust and short, not extending beyond anterior orbital margin; squamosal large, forming most of the posterior margin of cheek region and reaching down to ventral margin of cheek, processus quadratus of quadratojugal thus apparently separated from main body of bone; prefrontal and postfrontal subequal in size; external naris large, of triangular shape; posterior maxillary dentition reduced; teeth robust and crenulated in typical fashion, without carinae; 44 presacral vertebrae, 88 preflexural vertebrae; postflexural segment of tail very long and flexible; neural arches of posterior thoracal region very low with expanded processus spinosi; rib articulations of thorax unicipital posteriorly; forefin with three primary digits, fourth digit postaxial, one accessory digit; third digit subdivided into 3 secondary rays; no notches in leading edge of forefin; digits of the forefin fanning out distally; most autopodial elements rounded and widely spaced; pelvis tripartite; ilium with anterior spine-like process; pubis slender and curved; ischium broad and subrectangular; hindfin tridactyl, most elements of first digit notched.

Suevoleviathan was unique among ichthyosaurs in that it retained relatively large forefins. Other ichthyosaurs exhibit a trend of decreasing forefin size, reflecting its shift in function from paraxial propulsion during low velocity swimming to steering in basal ichthyopterygia and the more derived ichthyosaurs respectively. The large forefin of Suevoleviathan suggests it retained its plesiomorphic function in low velocity propulsion, although axial undulations of the caudal region were likely still the predominant locomotory mechanism at high velocities.

== See also ==
- List of ichthyosaurs
- Timeline of ichthyosaur research
