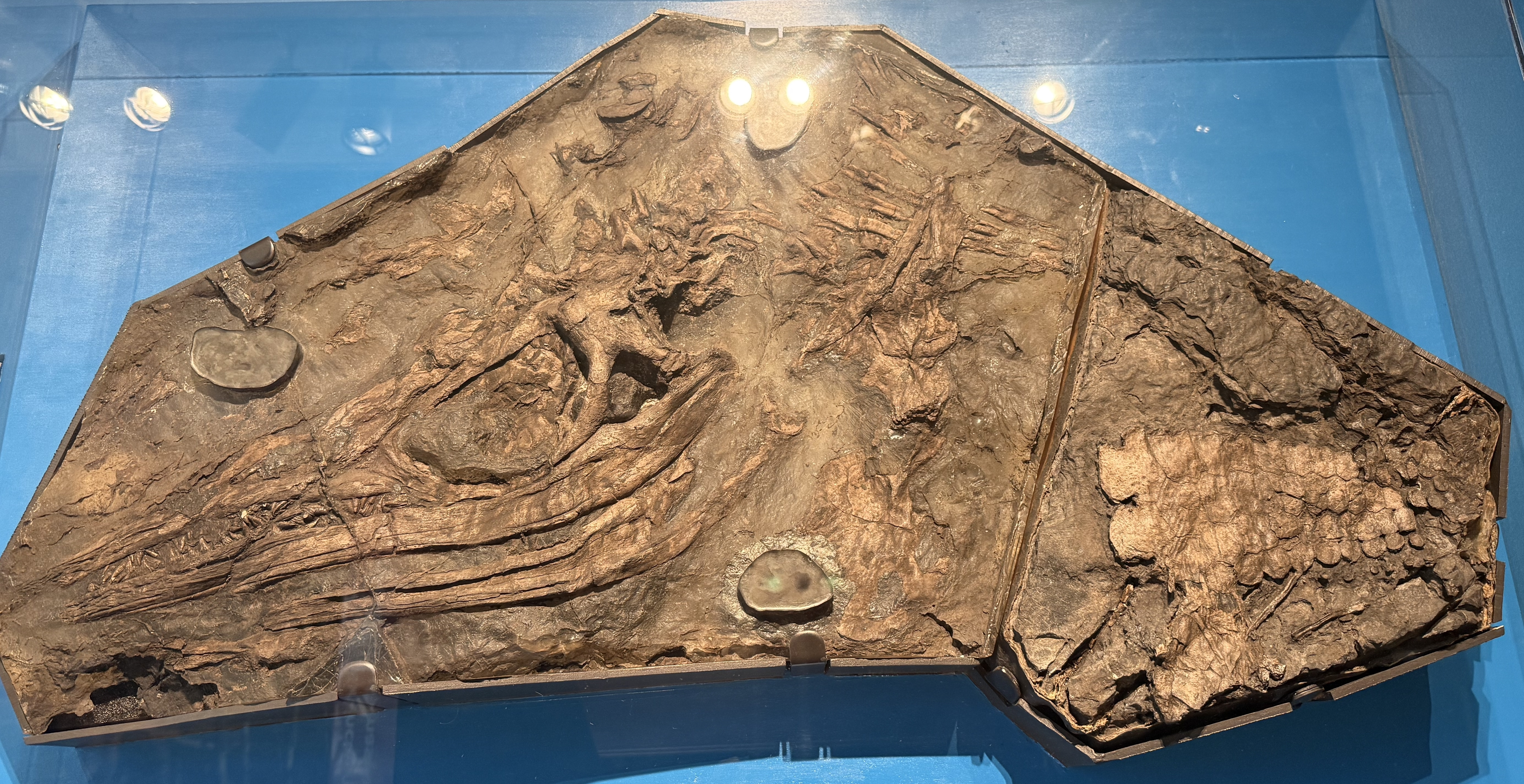
- Holotype specimen
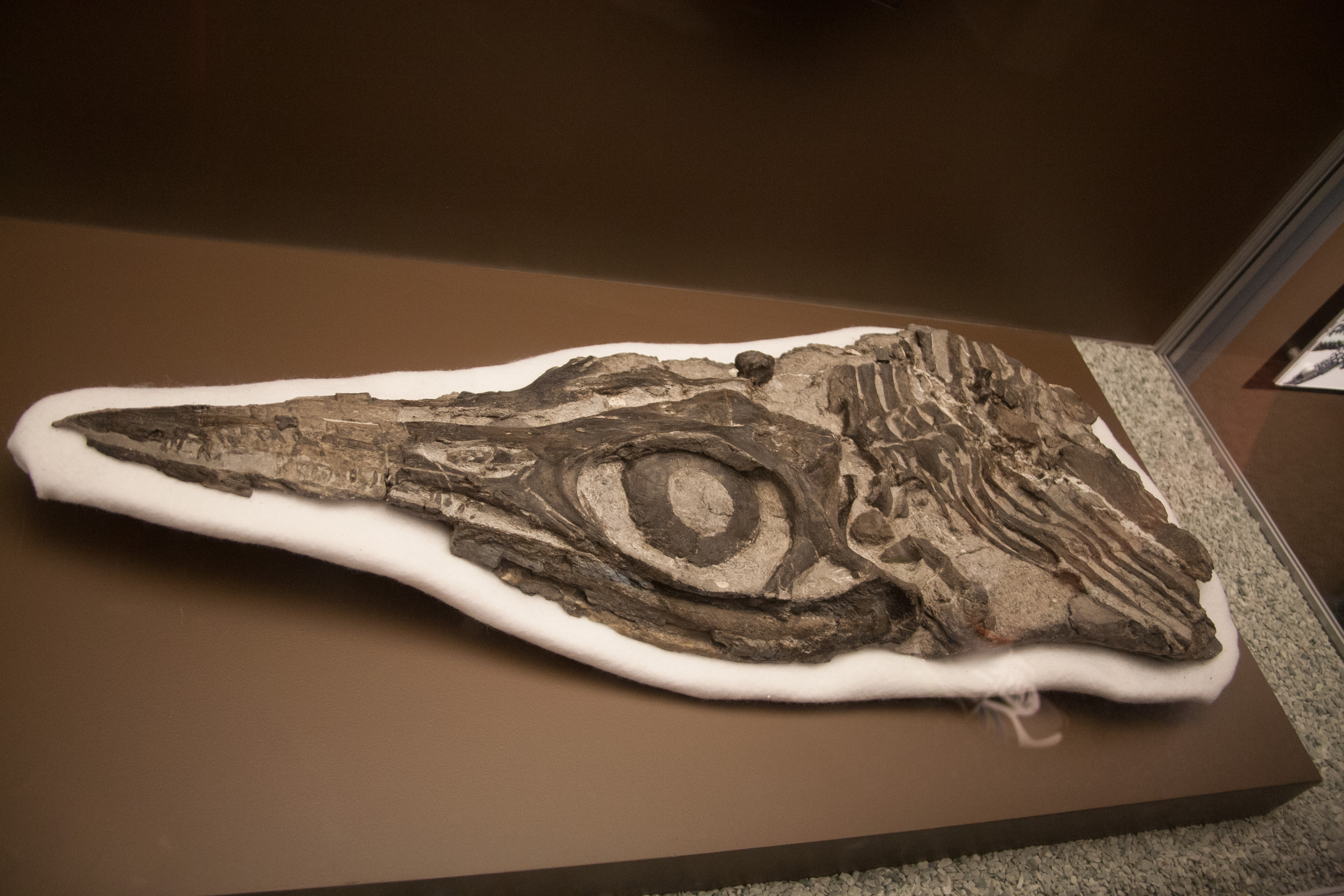
- Skull and front part of the second specimen

Scientific classification
- Kingdom: Animalia
- Phylum: Chordata
- Class: Reptilia
- Order: †Ichthyosauria
- Node: †Parvipelvia
- Family: †Macgowaniidae; McGowan & Motani, 2003
- Genus: †Macgowania; Motani, 1999
- Species: †M. janiceps

Binomial name
- †Macgowania janiceps (McGowan, 1996 [originally Ichthyosaurus])

= Macgowania =

Macgowania Temporal range: Late Triassic, 210 Ma

Extinct genus of reptiles

Macgowania is an extinct genus of parvipelvian ichthyosaur known from British Columbia of Canada. It was a small ichthyosaur around 3 metres (9.8 ft) in total body length.

== History of research ==
The first specimen of Macgowania is the holotype ROM 41992 (RBCM EH 91.2.5), a partial skeleton which preserved nearly complete skull, almost complete forefin and other postcranial elements. It was collected in the Jewitt Spur locality from the Pardonet Formation, dating to the middle Norian stage of the Late Triassic, about 210 million years ago. It was found on the northern shore of the Peace Reach branch of Williston Lake. A second specimen from the same locality, ROM 41991, may be referable to this genus based on its forefin structure, but this cannot be confirmed due to its poor preservation. Macgowania has a very stable position in many cladistic analyses. The family Macgowaniidae was named by McGowan and Motani in 2003 to include this genus.

A second specimen of Macgowania was discovered by a British Columbian outdoor club in August 2009. This specimen was largely complete, though it was preserved in a fractured slab of rock balanced on a steep slope above the Graham River, in danger of immediate destruction. The club alerted the Royal Tyrrell Museum of Paleontology about the ichthyosaur, and an expedition to retrieve it was sent out the following month. Once the expedition reached the specimen, only the front part of the skeleton remained, the rest having detached and fallen into the river. The team from the Royal Tyrell Museum worked with the outdoor club to collect the surviving portion of the specimen. A plaster jacket was created to protect it from damage, after which it was brought down the slope using ropes. Back at the museum, the specimen was prepared by Mark Mitchell and given the catalog number TMP 2009.121.1. A scientific description of the specimen written by Donald Henderson was published in 2015, in which it was identified as Macgowania janiceps.

== Etymology ==
Macgowania was originally described by Chris McGowan in 1996 as Ichthyosaurus janiceps. It was reassigned to its own genus by Ryosuke Motani in 1999 and the type species is Macgowania janiceps. The generic name honors Chris McGowan for describing the type species. The specific name is said to derived from Janus, Latin for the Roman god with two opposite faces, and ceps, Latin for "with a head". The ~ceps suffix is derived from caput. Caput is Latin for head.

== See also ==
- List of ichthyosaurs
- Timeline of ichthyosaur research
