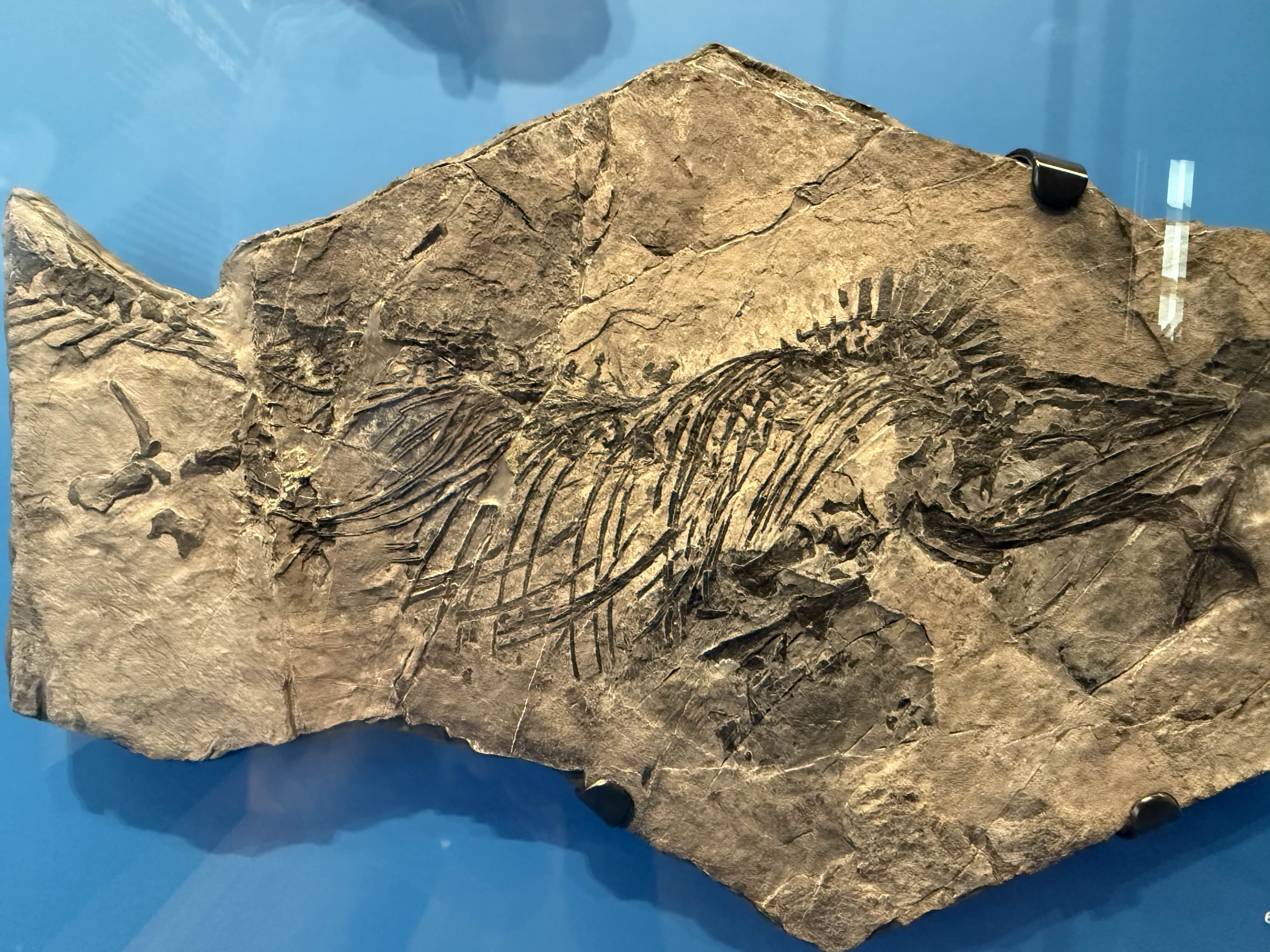
- Holotype, on display at the ROM
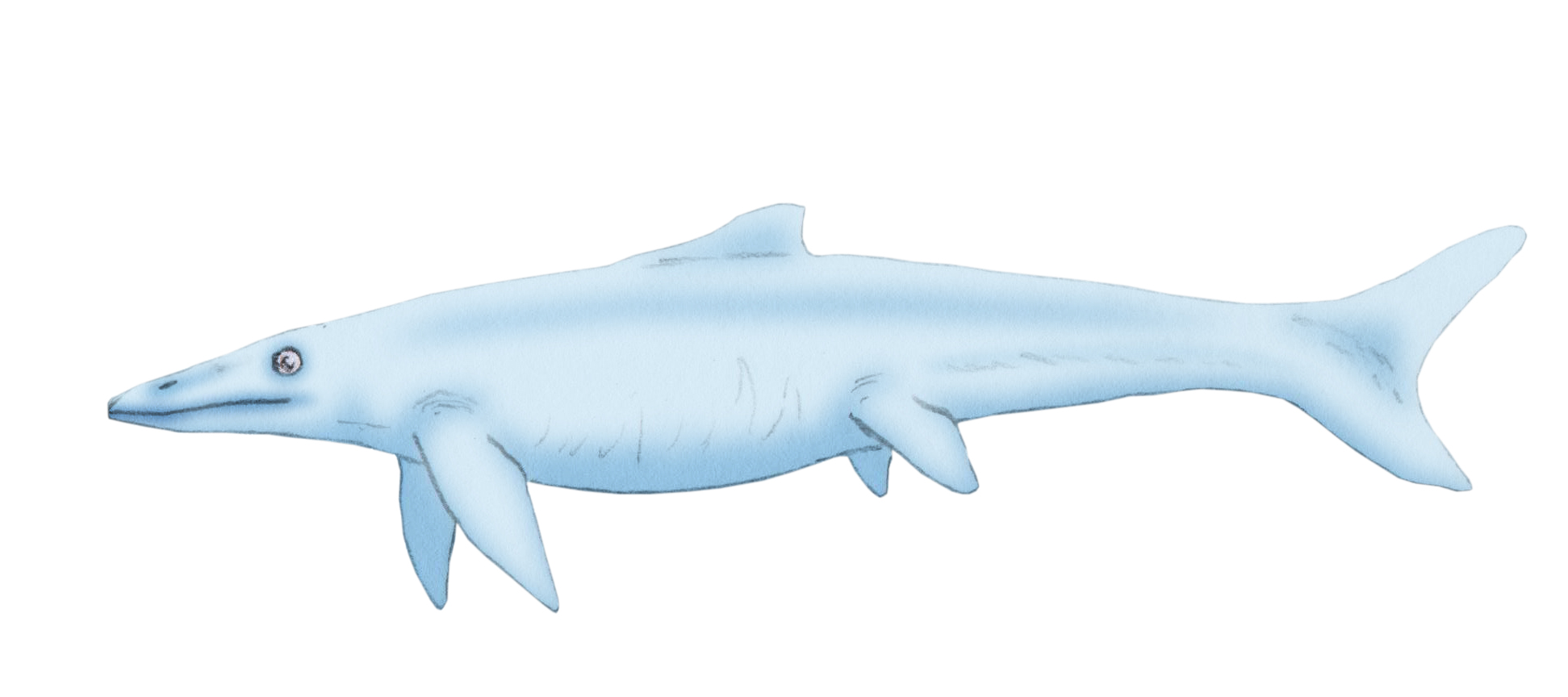
- Restoration

Scientific classification
- Kingdom: Animalia
- Phylum: Chordata
- Class: Reptilia
- Order: †Ichthyosauria
- Node: †Parvipelvia
- Family: †Hudsonelpidiidae; MacGowan & Motani, 2003
- Genus: †Hudsonelpidia; MacGowan, 1995
- Species: †H. brevirostris

Binomial name
- †Hudsonelpidia brevirostris MacGowan, 1995

= Hudsonelpidia =

Hudsonelpidia Temporal range: Late Triassic, 210 Ma

Extinct genus of reptiles

Hudsonelpidia is an extinct genus of small parvipelvian ichthyosaur known from British Columbia of Canada.

== Taxonomy ==
Hudsonelpidia was named by Chris McGowan in 1995 and the type species is Hudsonelpidia brevirostris.

== Description ==
Hudsonelpidia is known only from the holotype, a nearly complete skeleton measuring less than 2 metres (6.6 ft) long. It was collected in the Jewitt Spur locality from the Pardonet Formation, dating to the middle Norian stage of the Late Triassic, about 210 million years ago. It was found on the northern shore of the Peace Reach branch of Williston Lake. Hudsonelpidia has a very stable position in many cladistic analyses. The family Hudsonelpidiidae was named by McGowan and Motani in 2003 to include this genus.

== See also ==
- List of ichthyosaurs
- Timeline of ichthyosaur research
