= Luning Formation =

Geologic formation in Nevada, United States

- Stratigraphic range: Late Carnian-Early Norian; ~227 Ma
- Type: Formation

Location
- Region: Nevada
- Country: United States

The Luning Formation is a geologic formation in Nevada. It preserves fossils dating back to the Triassic period. The lowermost strata dates to the late Carnian-early Norian boundary.

== Fossil content ==
The Luning Formation contains significant fossils of invertebrate fauna such as ammonites, bivalves and brachiopods. The site is known for its ichthyosaur fossils.

=== Vertebrates ===
Vertebrates reported from the Luning Formation
Genus	Species	Location	Stratigraphic position	Material	Notes	Images
Actinopterygii		West Union Canyon.	S. kerri ammonoid zone.	Small fish bones.	An indeterminate bony fish.	
Chondrichthyes		West Union Canyon	K. macrolobatus ammonoid zone.	An elasmobranch fin spine.	An indeterminate cartilaginous fish.	
Metapolygnathus	M. primitius	Pilot & Cedar Mountains.		Conodont elements.	A conodont.	
Shonisaurus	S. popularis	West Union Canyon, Berlin–Ichthyosaur State Park.		Remains of approximately 40 individuals.	A large ichthyosaur.	
Vertebrata indet.		West Union Canyon.	S. kerri ammonoid zone or above.	Indeterminate bone fragments.		

=== Invertebrates ===
- Sagenites minaensis
- Spiriferina gregaria
- S. peneckei
- Terebratula debilis
- Terebratula suborbicularis
- Tibetothyris julica

==== Arthropods ====
Arthropods reported from the Luning Formation
Genus	Species	Location	Stratigraphic position	Material	Notes	Images
Platypleon	P. nevadensis			A fragmentary specimen containing two pleonal segments and the proximal portion of the left uropods.	A decapod.	
Pseudoglyphea	P. mulleri			Carapace.	A litogastrid decapod.	
Rosagammarus	R. minichiellus	Shoshone Mountains.		Right half of a tail.	A lobster-like decapod, originally misidentified as a giant amphipod.	

==== Brachiopods ====
Brachiopods reported from the Luning Formation
Genus	Species	Location	Stratigraphic position	Material	Notes	Images
Balatonospira?	B.? cf. B. lipoldi	Dunlap Canyon & Cinnabar Canyon.	Lower Member.	Numerous specimens.	A spiriferidan.	
Plectoconcha	P. aequiplicata	Berlin-Ichthyosaur state park & Pilot Mountains.	Limestone and secondary dolomite member, & Lower Member.	Numerous specimens.	A terebratulid.	
Plectoconcha	P. newbyi	Dunlap Canyon & Cinnabar Canyon.	Lower Member.	Numerous specimens.	A terebratulid.	
Rhaetina	R. gregaria	Cinnabar & Dunlap Canyons, & Berlin–Ichthyosaur State Park.	Lower Member & limestone and secondary dolomite member.	Around 10 specimens.	A terebratulidan.	
Spondylospira	S. lewesensis	Dunlap Canyon & Berlin–Ichthyosaur State Park.	Lower Member.	3 complete specimens, 1 brachial & 2 pedicle valves.	A spiniferidan.	
Zeilleria	Z. cf. Z. elliptica	Dunlap & Cinnabar Canyons.	Lower Member.	Over 12 specimens.	A zeilleriid.	
Zugmayerella	Z. uncinata	Dunlap Canyon & Cinnabar Canyon.	Lower Member.	Numerous specimens.	A spiniferidan.	
Zugmayerella	?Z. sp.	14.5 km east of Mina, Nevada.	Probably Lower Member.	A pedicle valve (UMIP 6952).	A spiniferidan.	

==== Cephalopods ====
Cephalopods reported from the Luning Formation
Genus	Species	Location	Stratigraphic position	Material	Notes	Images
Guembelites	G. clavatus	Pilot Mountains & Shoshone Mountains.			An ammonite.	
Guembelites	G. jandianus	Pilot Mountains & Shoshone Mountains.			An ammonite.	
Guembelites	G. philostrati	Pilot Mountains & Shoshone Mountains.			An ammonite.	
Pararcestes	P. sp.	Mustang Canyon locality & Dunlap Canyon.			An ammonite.	
Stikinoceras	S. kerri	Pilot Mountains & Shoshone Mountains.			An ammonite.	
Thisbites	T. sp.	Pilot Mountains & Shoshone Mountains.			An ammonite.	

==== Cnidarians ====
Cnidarians reported from the Luning Formation
Genus	Species	Location	Stratigraphic position	Material	Notes	Images
Ampakabastrea	A. cowichanensis	Dunlap Canyon, Mina vicinity & Mineral County, Nevada.		6 specimens.	A stony coral also found in the Osobb Formation.	
Areaseris	A. nevadaensis	Dunlap Canyon.		Multiple specimens.	A stony coral also found in California.	
Astraeomorpha	A. confusa	Dunlap Canyon.		2 specimens.	A stony coral.	
Ceriostella	C. martini	Pilot Mountains & east of Mina.		6 specimens.	A stony coral also found in the Osobb Formation.	
Ceriostella	C. parva	Pilot Mountains.		3 specimens.	A stony coral also found in Alaska.	
Curtoseris	C. dunlapcanyonae	Dunlap Canyon.		UMIP 17010.	A stony coral also found in Alaska & Peru.	
Distichomeandra	D. cf. minor	Cedar Mountains (Dicalite Summit).		UMIP 26869.	A stony coral.	
Flexastrea	F. serialis	Mineral County, Nevada.		4 specimens.	A stony coral.	
Khytrastrea	K. cuifiamorpha	Dunlap Canyon.		UMIP 7465 & 7480.	A stony coral.	
Khytrastrea	K. silberlingi	Dunlap Canyon.		UMIP 17002-1.	A stony coral also found in the Osobb Formation.	
Margarogyra	M. silberlingi	Mineral County, Nevada.			A stony coral also found in the Osobb Formation.	
Margarophyllidae undetermined genus		East of Mina, Pilot Mountains.		Fragmentary, recrystallized specimen (UMIP 6676).	A stony coral.	
Meandrovolzeia	M. sp.	Pilot Mountains.		A colony fragment UMIP 6720.	A stony coral.	
Minasteria	M. shastensis	Pilot Mountains & Mina vicinity.		7 specimens.	A stony coral also found in California.	
Nevadoseris	N. punctata	Dunlap & Cinnabar Canyons.		Multiple specimens.	A stony coral also found in the Osobb Formation.	
Plectodiscus	P. berlinensis	West Union Canyon, Berlin–Ichthyosaur State Park.		UCMP 38211.	A chondrophore.	
Retiophyllia	R. nevadae	Mineral County, Nevada.		UCMP 153092.	A stony coral.	
Retiophyllia	R. sp.	Dunlap Canyon.		Fragments of corallites.	A stony coral.	
Thamnasteria	T. cf. smithi	Dunlap & Cinnabar canyons.		2 specimens.	A thamnasteriid coral.	

==== Sponges ====
Sponges reported from the Luning Formation
Genus	Species	Location	Stratigraphic position	Material	Notes	Images
Polycystocoelia	P. silberlingi	Garfield Hills.	Lower Member.	Oe specimen (UMIP 6653).	A demosponge.	

== See also ==
- List of fossiliferous stratigraphic units in Nevada
- Paleontology in Nevada
