= Nevada State Route 839 =

State highway in Mineral and Churchill counties in Nevada, United States

State Route 839
- Nevada Scheelite Mine Road
- SR 839 highlighted in red

Route information
- Maintained by NDOT
- Length: 18.041 mi (29.034 km)
- Existed: July 1, 1976–present
- History: Prior 1976 was part of Nevada State Route 31

Major junctions
- South end: Rawhide Road
- North end: US 50

Location
- Country: United States
- State: Nevada
- Counties: Mineral, Churchill

Highway system
- Nevada State Highway System; Interstate; US; State; Pre‑1976; Scenic
← SR 829	→ SR 844

State Route 839 (SR 839), also known as Nevada Scheelite Mine Road, is an 18-mile (29 km) state highway in Mineral and Churchill counties in Nevada, United States, that runs from the Nevada Scheelite Mine to U.S. Route 50 (US 50).

== Route description ==
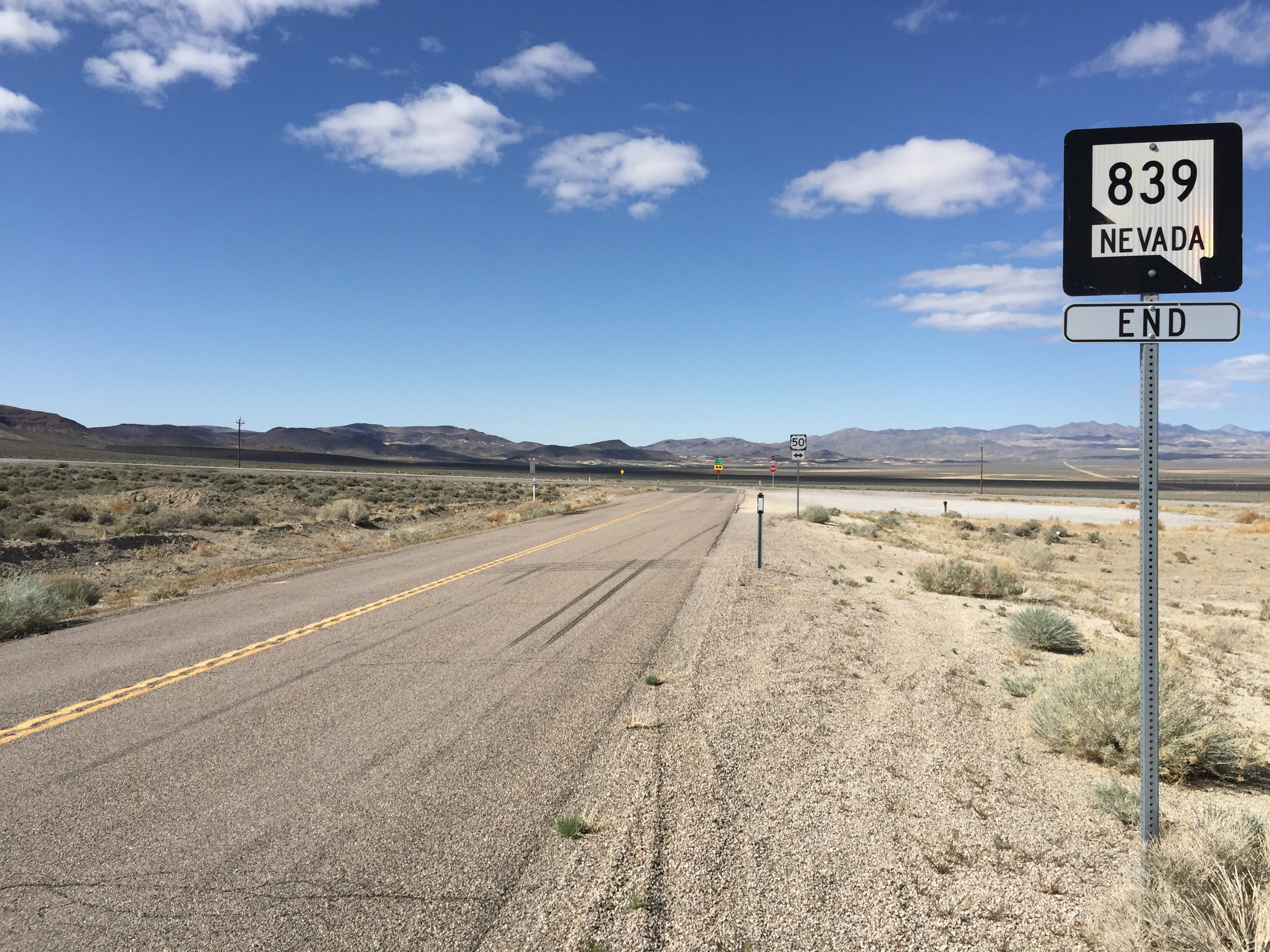
Northern terminus of SR 839 at US 50, April 2015

SR 839 begins at the south end of the pavement, just north of the Nevada Scheelite Mine on the eastern edge of the Sand Springs Range, roughly 23 miles (37 km) northwest of Gabbs. From its southern terminus SR 839 heads northerly along the eastern edge of the Sandy Springs Range for its length. Roughly three miles (4.8 km) north, SR 839 enters the Fairview Valley and continues along the western edge of the valley for the remainder of its course.

Approximately twelve miles (19 km) father north, SR 839 begins running along the western edge of a United States Navy reservation at Labou Flat. About three miles (4.8 km) later SR 839 reaches it northern terminus at a T intersection with US 50, roughly two miles (3.2 km) west of the former community of Frenchman, fifteen miles (24 km) west of Middlegate, and twenty-eight miles (45 km) southeast of Fallon.

SR 839 runs roughly parallel with, but approximately ten miles (16 km) west of the northernmost part of Nevada State Route 361.

== History ==
Prior to the 1976 mass renumbering of Nevada State Routes this road was a disconnected segment of State Route 31.

== Major intersections ==
County	Location	mi	km	Destinations	Notes
Mineral		0.000	0.000	Rawhide Rd south – Nevada Scheelite Mine	Southern terminus
Churchill		18.041	29.034	US 50 west (Lincoln Hwy / Austin Hwy) – Fallon, Reno, Carson City US 50 east (Lincoln Hwy / Austin Hwy) – Austin, Eureka, Ely	Northern terminus; T intersection
1.000 mi = 1.609 km; 1.000 km = 0.621 mi

== See also ==
- List of state highways in Nevada
