= Nevada State Route 361 =

State highway in Nevada, United States

State Route 361
- Gabbs Valley Road
- SR 361 highlighted in red

Route information
- Maintained by NDOT
- Length: 62.853 mi (101.152 km)
- Existed: July 1, 1976–present

Major junctions
- South end: Future I-11 / US 95 in Luning
- North end: US 50 in Middlegate

Location
- Country: United States
- State: Nevada
- Counties: Mineral, Nye, Churchill

Highway system
- Nevada State Highway System; Interstate; US; State; Pre‑1976; Scenic
← SR 360	→ SR 362

State Route 361 (SR 361), Gabbs Valley Road, is a 62.853-mile (101.152 km) state highway in Mineral, Nye, and Churchill counties in Nevada, United States. The highway serves the town of Gabbs following Gabbs Valley Road through the extreme northwestern tip of Nye County. Gabbs is isolated from the rest of the county, requiring travel on SR 361 through other counties in order to reach any other major town in Nye County. SR 361 was previously known as State Route 23.

== Route description ==
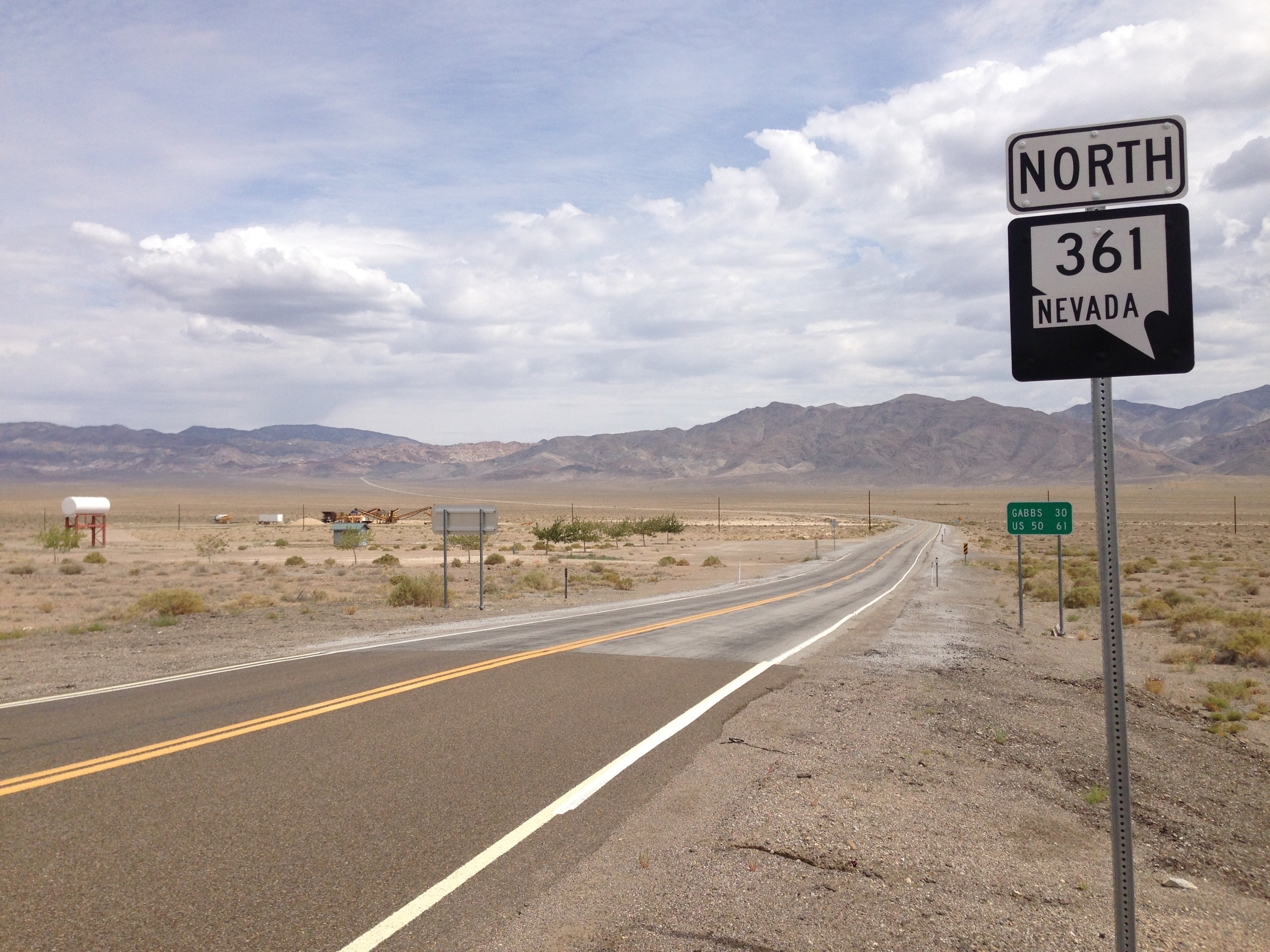
First reassurance sign along northbound SR 361 as seen in July 2014

State Route 361 in Mineral County at a junction with U.S. Route 95 approximately 1.0 mile (1.6 km) northwest of Luning. From there, the highway heads north towards the mountains of the Gabbs Valley Range. The route curves sharply east to climb up to Calavada Summit (elevation 6,254 feet [1,906 m]), and then turns northward again to pass over Petrified Summit (elevation 6,145 feet [1,873 m]) before leaving the mountain range. Route 361 then heads northeast, entering Gabbs Valley and Nye County as it approaches the town of Gabbs.

As the highway heads out of Gabbs it intersects State Route 844, providing access to the Berlin-Ichthyosaur State Park and Ione via the Humboldt-Toiyabe National Forest. SR 361 continues north from here, reentering Mineral County briefly before entering Churchill County. The route comes to an end at an intersection with U.S. Route 50 at Middlegate.

== History ==
SR 361 was formerly known as State Route 23

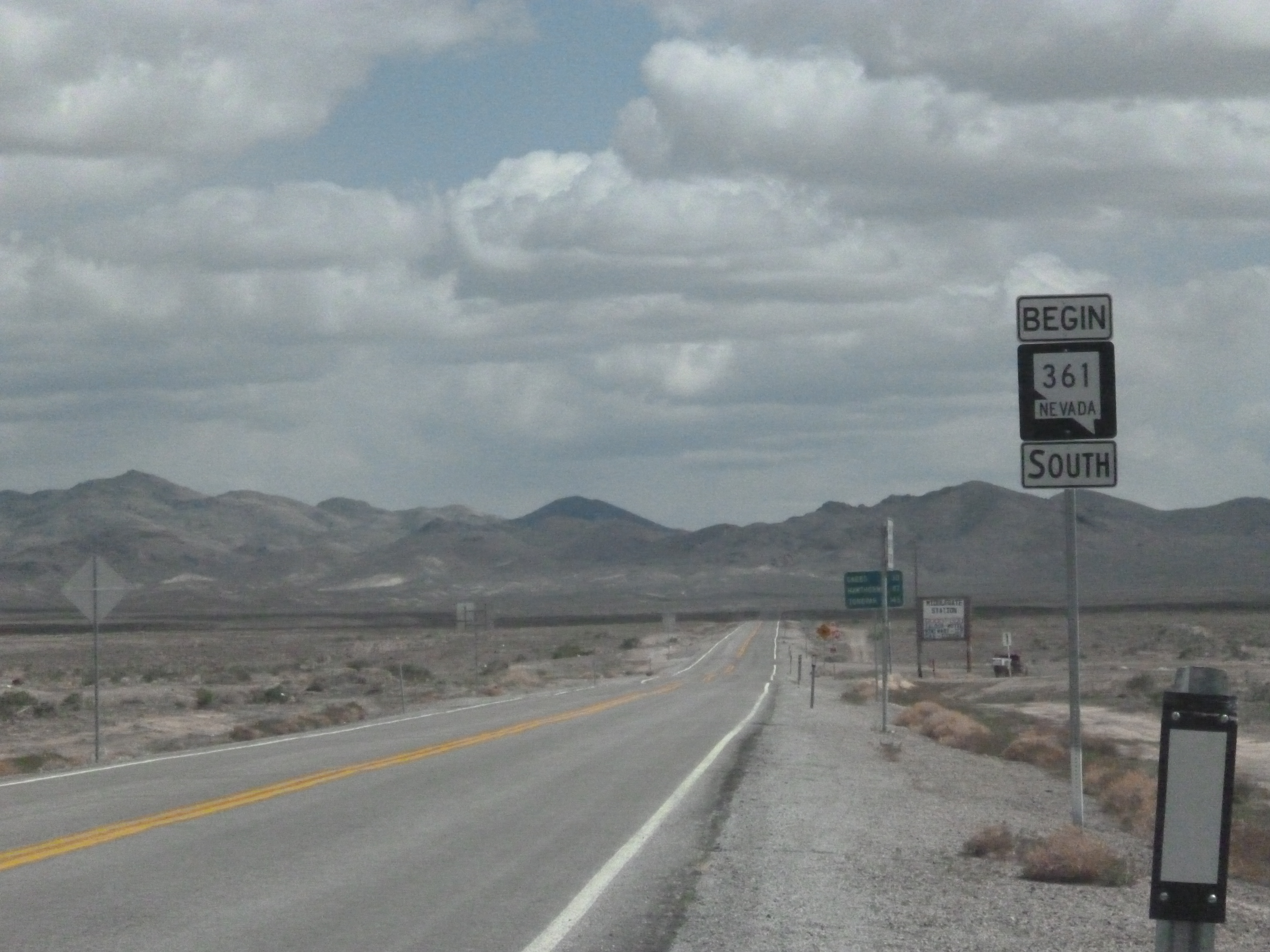
Beginning of southbound SR 361 in Middlegate as seen in May 2014

The general routing of present-day SR 361 first appeared on state highway maps in 1929 as an unpaved road, State Route 23. By 1939, the portion of the route in Mineral and Nye Counties had been realigned further east. The final alignment of SR 23, shown as a paved highway, was in place by 1946.

The route remained relatively unchanged until the 1976 renumbering of Nevada's highway system. On July 1, the SR 23 designation was replaced by State Route 361. This change was first seen on the 1978–79 edition of the official highway map.

== Major intersections ==
Note: Mileposts in Nevada reset at county lines. The start and end mileposts for each county are given in the county column.

County	Location	mi	km	Destinations	Notes
Mineral; 0.00–22.20	Luning	0.000	0.000	Future I-11 / US 95 – Hawthorne, Tonopah	Proposed interchange; southern terminus
Nye; 0.00–24.96				SR 844 east – Berlin-Ichthyosaur State Park, Ione	Western terminus of SR 844
Churchill; 0.00–15.69	Middlegate	62.853	101.152	US 50 – Fallon, Austin	Northern terminus
1.000 mi = 1.609 km; 1.000 km = 0.621 mi
