= Charles Lewis Camp =

American palaeontologist and zoologist (1893–1975)

- Born: March 12, 1893; Jamestown, North Dakota, U.S.
- Died: August 14, 1975 (aged 82); San Jose, California, U.S.
- Education: University of California Berkeley, Columbia University
- Spouse: Jessie Margaret Pratt
- Scientific career
- Fields: Paleontology, Zoology, History
- Workplaces: American Museum of Natural History, University of California Museum of Paleontology
- Academic advisors: Joseph Grinnell, William K. Gregory, Henry Fairfield Osborn

Charles Lewis Camp (March 12, 1893 – August 14, 1975) was an American palaeontologist and zoologist, working from the University of California, Berkeley. He took part in excavations at the 'Placerias Quarry', in 1930 and the forty Shonisaurus skeleton discoveries of the 1960s, in what is now the Berlin-Ichthyosaur State Park. Camp served as the third director of the University of California Museum of Paleontology from 1930 to 1949, and coincidentally as chair of the UC Berkeley Paleontology Department between 1939 and 1949. Camp named a number of species of marine reptiles such as Shonisaurus and Plotosaurus, as well as the dinosaur Segisaurus.

== Early life ==
Charles Lewis Camp was born on March 12, 1893, in Jamestown, North Dakota. His father was a U.S. district attorney and amateur geologist. He was raised in Sierra Madre, California, where he met zoologist Joseph Grinnell, with whom he would study and travel with as a teenager. His later scientific interests were influenced by visits to John C. Merriam's fossil beds in Rancho La Brea, and in 1908, he was a member of the Museum of Vertebrate Zoology's first field expedition.

== Education and scientific career ==
Camp attended Pasadena High School, then Throop Polytechnic Institute before transferring to the University of California, Berkeley, to continue studying with Grinnell. He graduated in 1915 with a degree in zoology. He attended Columbia University, studying under William King Gregory, and received his M.A. in 1916, while also working as an Assistant Instructor in Zoology at Columbia and a Research Assistant at the American Museum of Natural History. He was first recruited to the museum's Herpetology Department by Mary C. Dickerson, though his work was also heavily influenced by Henry Fairfield Osborn and Gregory, who guided his doctoral dissertation towards the evolution and osteology of lizards. His work and studies were interrupted by World War I in 1917, when he attended the Citizens' Military Training Camp in Plattsburgh, New York. Camp served two years overseas in the American Expeditionary Forces, where he was promoted from a First Lieutenant to a Second Lieutenant. He returned to New York in 1919, where he resumed his dissertation and work at the Museum of Natural History. During this time, he worked alongside Gladwyn Kingsley Noble, Alfred S. Romer, and Karl Patterson Schmidt. In 1923, Camp's dissertation, Classification of the Lizards was published by the AMNH, and he received his Ph.D. from Columbia. He had begun teaching in the Zoology Department at UC Berkeley the year prior, but his research interests shifted into paleontology around 1930, and he transferred to the Department of Paleontology, where he would remain until 1960. From 1930 to 1949, he also served as the director of the University of California Museum of Paleontology. While at the Museum of Paleontology, he worked closely with Annie M. Alexander and in 1930, published a definitive study of phytosaurs. In 1935 and 1936, he received a Guggenheim Foundation Fellowship, which financed field work in Europe, South Africa, and China. In the early 1940s, his research largely took place in California, and he published on mosasaurs as well as the phylogeny of horses. From 1939 to 1949, he also served as the chairman of the Department of Paleontology at Berkeley, before relinquishing the role to focus on the study of anomodont reptiles in South Africa and Arizona.

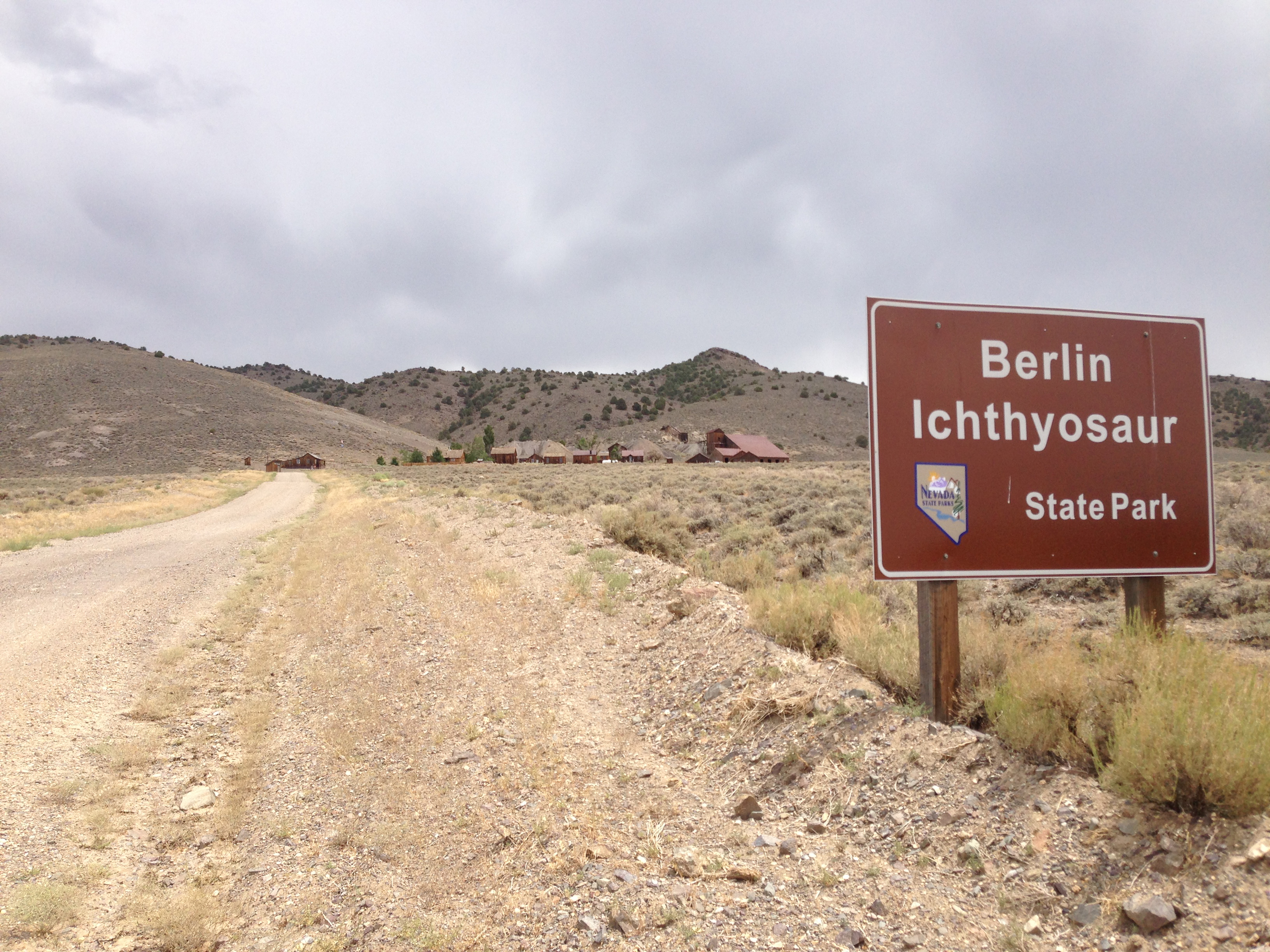
Berlin-Ichthyosaur State Park, where Camp worked in the 1950s.

In 1954, the University of Nevada approached Camp to excavate large ichthyosaur beds in the Shoshone Mountains, a project that lasted four years and resulted in the creation of the Berlin-Ichthyosaur State Park and National Natural Landmark. Camp and Samuel Paul Welles excavated 40 late Triassic ichthyosaurs, and continued to collect at the Park between 1963 and 1965, with Camp's studies being published post-humously by Joseph T. Gregory in 1976 and 1980. He retired from Berkeley in 1960, but continued his paleontological research, studying labryinthodonts in western Australia with John Cosgriff.

In 1968, Camp received an honorary doctorate from the University of California in recognition of his contributions to the fields of science and history. Throughout his career, he was a Fellow of the American Association for the Advancement of Science, as well as a member of the Geological Society of America and the California Academy of Sciences.

== Historical work ==
Camp was also an important bibliographer and historian of Western America, first becoming interested in the subject after returning to his studies at Columbia and feeling homesick. This aspect of his career is represented most notably by two works. The first is his biography of American pioneer James Clyman, which Bernard De Voto called "one of the half-dozen classics in the field." The second work was the third edition of The Plains and the Rockies, published in 1953, in which Camp annotated and expanded on the work of Henry R. Wagner. Between 1923 and 1934, Camp was a director of the California Historical Society and a member of its Publications Committee; he frequently contributed to the California Historical Society Quarterly with work on Kit Carson, George Yount, and Benjamin Dore. In 1970, he received the Society's Henry Raup Wagner Memorial Award.

== Personal life and legacy ==
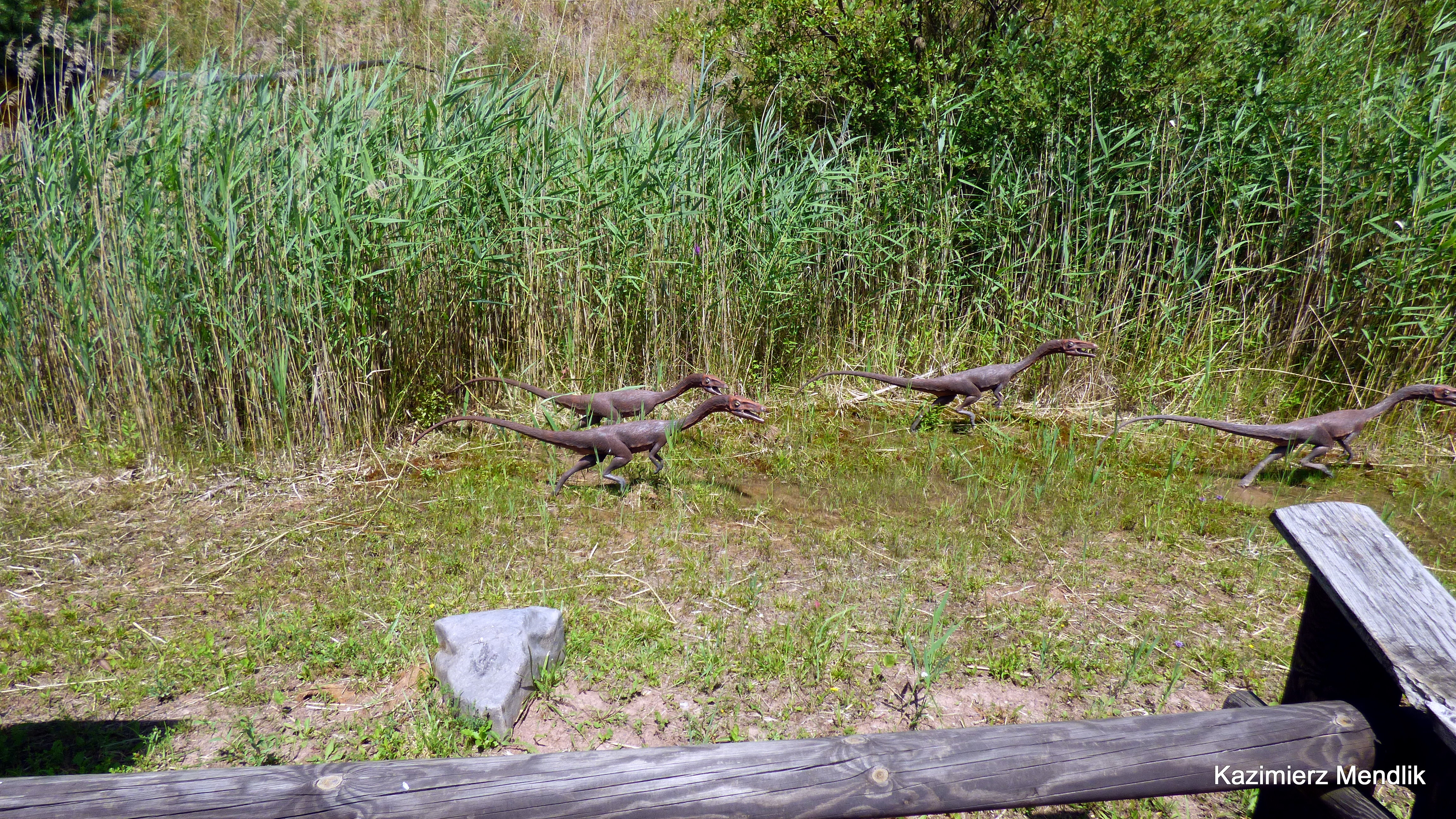
Reconstructions of Camposaurus, named after Charles Lewis Camp, at Jura Park Krasiejów in Poland.

In 1924, Camp married Jessie Margaret Pratt, with whom he would have four children. Pratt often accompanied him on his expeditions, and they remained married until her death in 1971. Camp was one of the early members of the historical preservation fraternity and social club, E Clampus Vitus, and was the Noble Grand Humbug of the Yerba Buena Lodge in 1938. He remarried in 1973, to Joanna Bilbrey.

The theropod Camposaurus was named in Camp's honor in 1998.

He died on August 14, 1975, in San Jose, California, from complications of pancreatic cancer.

== Publications ==
- California mosasaurs (Berkeley, Los Angeles, University of California Press, 1942).
- Classification of the lizards (New York, NY, 1923, reprinted in 1971). Doctoral thesis.
- Earth song: a prologue to history (Berkeley, California, University of California Press, 1952).
- Bibliography of fossil vertebrates 1944–1948 (Geological Society of America, New York,1953) co-author Morton Green (1917–2003).
- A Study of the Phytosaurs, with description of new material from Western North America (Berkeley, Los Angeles, University of California Press, 1930).
- Methods in Paleontology (California, University of California Press, 1937) co-author G. Dallas Hanna (1887–1970).
- Desert Rats. Berkeley, CA: Friends of the Bancroft Library, University of California. 1966. p. 55. LCCN 67001184. OCLC 1091273. LCC CT9990.C3
- Henry R. Wagner and Charles L. Camp, The Plains and the Rockies: A Bibliography of Original Narratives of Travel and Adventure, 1800–1865 (Columbus, OH: Long's College Book Co., 1953).
- James Clyman, Frontiersman, (Portland, OR: Champoeg Press, 1960).
