= Shoshone Mountains =

Mountain range in west central Nevada, US

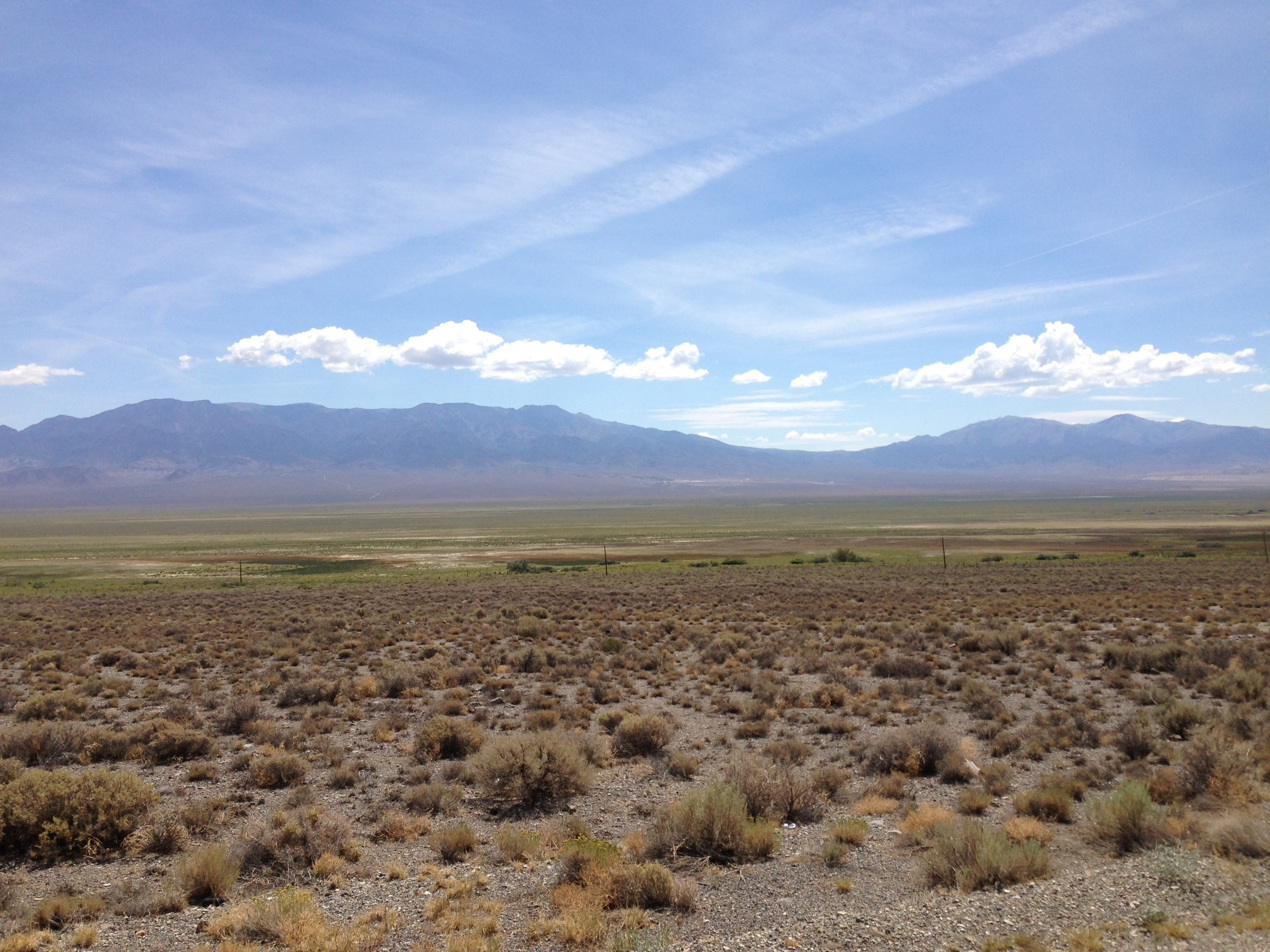
- Mount Jefferson and Shoshone Mountain in the Toquima Range from Nevada State Route 376 north of Carvers, Nevada

Highest point
- Peak: North Shoshone Peak
- Elevation: 3,143 m (10,312 ft)
- Coordinates: 39°09.0′N 117°33.6′W

Dimensions
- Length: 66 mi (106 km) N-S
- Width: 6 mi (9.7 km) E-W
- Area: 400 mi^{2} (1,000 km^{2})

Geography
- Location within Nevada
- Country: United States
- State: Nevada
- District(s): Nye and Lander counties
- Range coordinates: 38°53′56.740″N 117°32′33.359″W
- Topo map(s): USGS Ione Valley and Smith Creek Valley 30x60 Quads

The Shoshone Mountains, in west central Nevada, make up one of the longest mountain ranges in the state. The range runs in a general north-south direction in Nye and Lander counties. The range has a length of about 66 miles (106 km) and a width of about 6 mi (9.7 km) with an area of approximately 400 mi^{2} (1,000 km^{2}).

Named for the Shoshone Indians, the range receives 15 inches or less of precipitation in an average year. About 58% of the mountain range is managed by the Bureau of Land Management, with the Forest Service in charge of almost 42% of the area. A small part of the range is occupied by the Yomba Indian Reservation and private land.

The small community of Ione lies to the west of the range, and the Berlin-Ichthyosaur State Park is situated in the west margin of the range adjacent to Ione Valley just south of the Berlin ghost town. The old mining camp and ghost town of Golden is at the southern end of the range. US Highway 50 crosses the extreme north end of the range just south of Mount Airy and 16 miles (26 km) west of Austin. Nevada Route 722 crosses the range at Railroad Pass just north of Iron Mountain after crossing the Reese River Valley southwest from US 50 near Austin. It then continues in the Smith Creek Valley parallel to the range for 13 miles before turning west to rejoin US 50 near Middlegate across the Desatoya Range. Nevada Route 844 crosses the Paradise Range northeast of Gabbs and crosses the Ione Valley to the Berlin-Ichthyosaur State Park area.

Basins or valleys surrounding the range include the Ione Valley and the Smith Creek Valley on the west, the Reese River Valley to the east and the Big Smokey Valley to the south. Surrounding mountain ranges include the Toiyabe Range to the east, the Ravenswood and New Pass ranges to the north, the Desatoya and Paradise ranges to the west and the Cedar Mountains of Mineral County to the southwest.

Named peaks in the range include from south to north:

- Mount Ardivey 2,867 m (9,406 ft)
- Buffalo Mountain 2,754 m (9,035 ft)
- South Shoshone Peak 3,067 m (10,062 ft)
- North Shoshone Peak 3,143 m (10,312 ft)
- Iron Mountain 2,371 m (7,779 ft)
- Emigrant Peak 2,392 m (7,848 ft)
- Mount Airy 2,320 m (7,610 ft)

== Ecology ==
Vegetation is mostly sagebrush scrub and pinon-juniper. The Shoshone Mountains are home to mule deer, chipmunks, coyote, elk, and many other small animals such as shrews and squirrels. At least 21 species of birds can be found in the range during the year, including sparrows, woodpeckers and orioles.

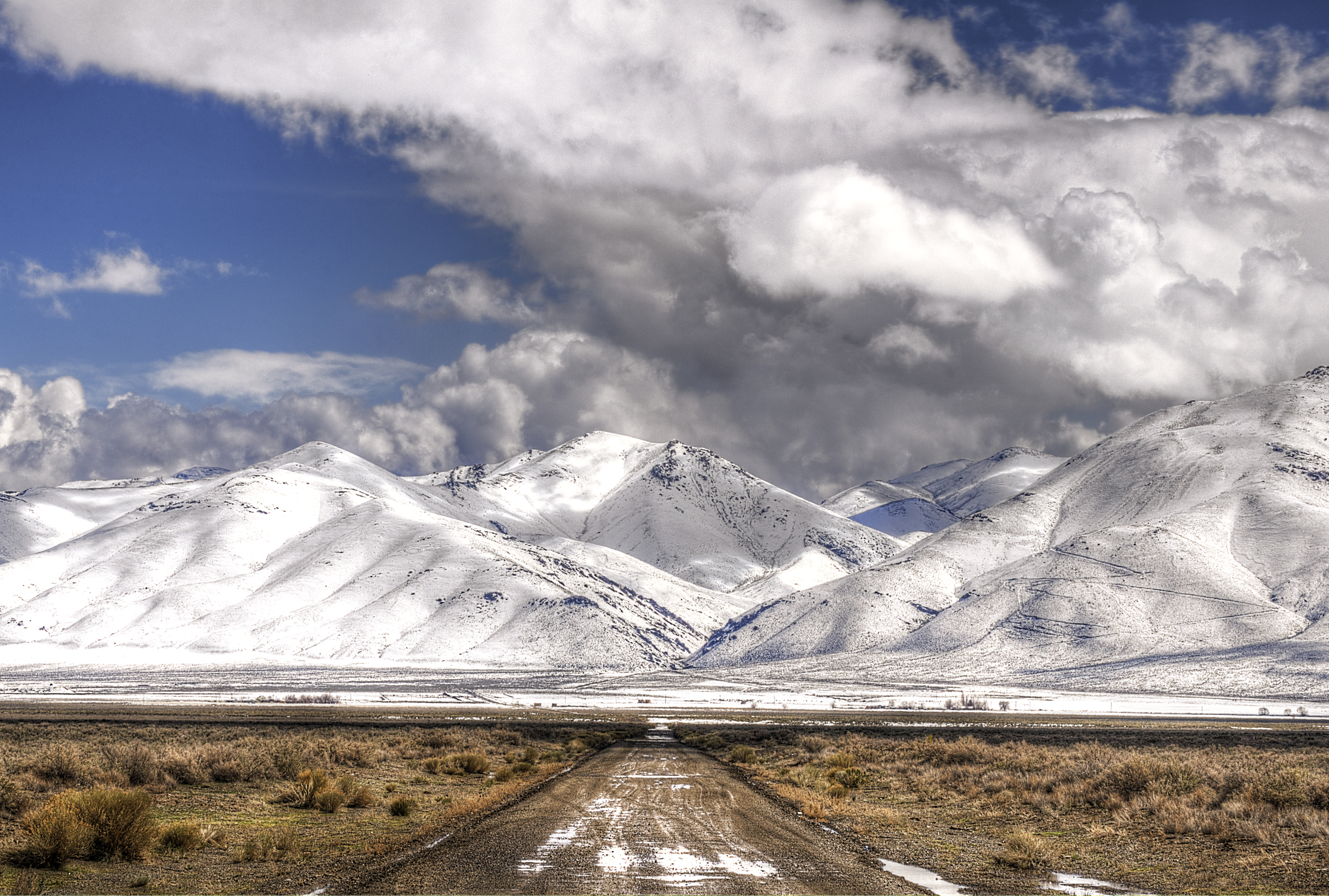
Road to the Shoshone Mountains, winter 2014
