= Nevada State Route 844 =

State highway in Nevada, United States

State Route 844
- Ione Road
- SR 844 highlighted in red

Route information
- Maintained by NDOT
- Length: 12.319 mi (19.826 km)
- Existed: 1976–present

Major junctions
- West end: SR 361 north of Gabbs
- East end: East of Humboldt-Toiyabe Nat'l Forest boundary

Location
- Country: United States
- State: Nevada
- County: Nye

Highway system
- Nevada State Highway System; Interstate; US; State; Pre‑1976; Scenic
← SR 839	→ SR 854

State Route 844 (SR 844) is a 12.319-mile (19.826 km) state highway in central Nevada, United States. The route follows Ione Road, covering part of the connection between State Route 361 and Berlin-Ichthyosaur State Park. SR 844 was formerly known as State Route 91, which extended further northeast to Ione.

== Route description ==
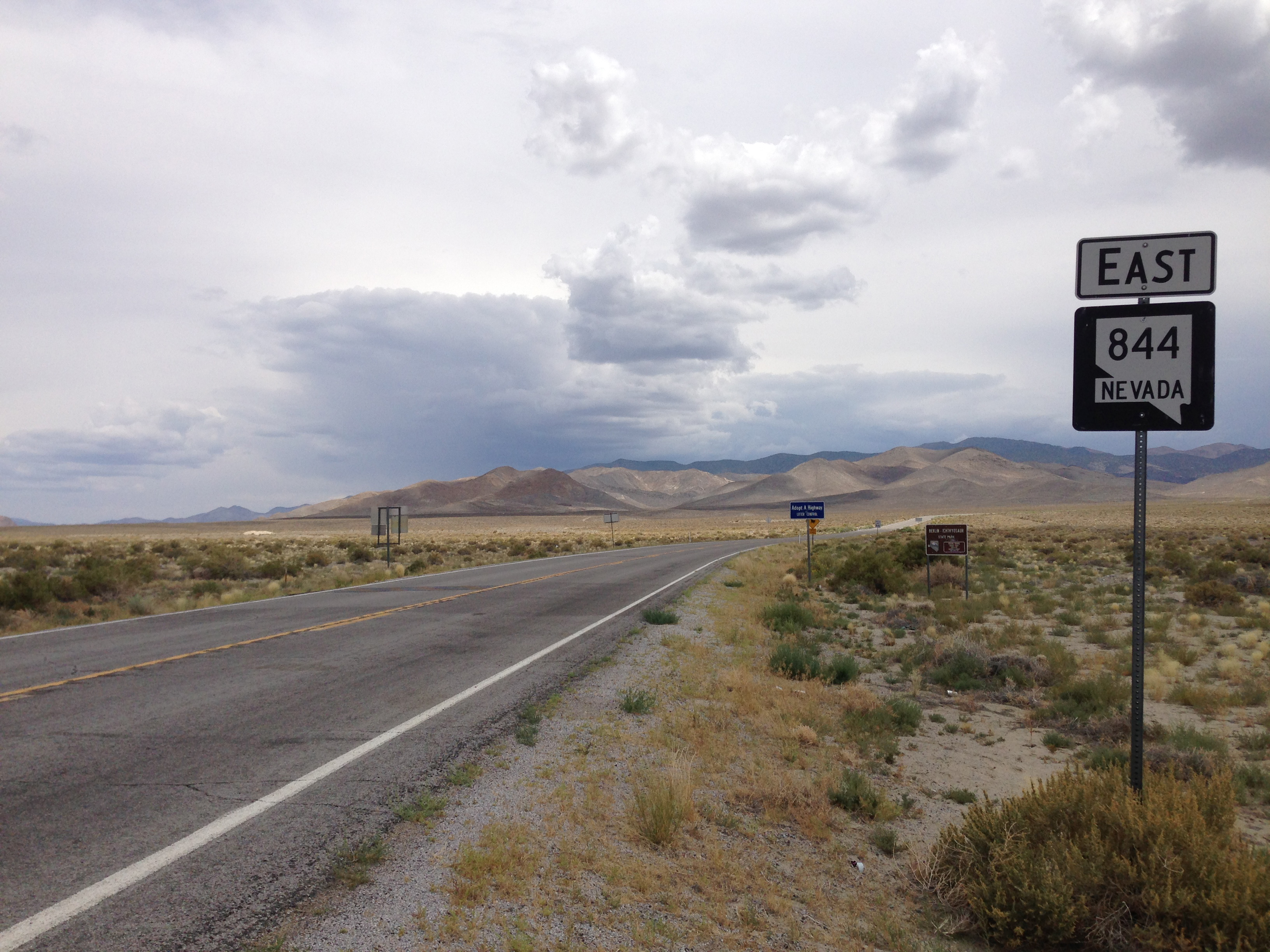
First reassurance sign along eastbound SR 844

State Route 844 begins at a junction with Gabbs Valley Road (SR 361) about 2 miles (3.2 km) north of Gabbs. The route heads east from there, passing through a small section of the Humboldt-Toiyabe National Forest. The state maintained highway ends in Ione Valley 2 miles (3.2 km) east of the national forest boundary. The road continues past the SR 844 terminus to connect to Berlin-Ichthyosaur State Park near the town site of Berlin and also provides connections to the town of Ione.

== History ==
SR 844 was formerly a part of the longer State Route 91.

The routing of SR 844 first appears on state maps in 1960 as State Route 91. This route was a graded road from State Route 23 (now SR 361) north of Gabbs east 3 miles (4.8 km) to near Iron Stakes Mine. From there, the route extended east another 13 miles (21 km) along an unpaved road towards the Ichthyosaur State Park area before turning north and traveling another 7 miles (11 km) to Ione. By 1968, the entire highway from the west terminus to the state park turn-off had been graded; this section was paved by 1973.

The route was changed in the 1976 renumbering of Nevada's state highway system. SR 91 was renumbered as State Route 844 on July 1, 1976. The new number was first shown on the 1978–79 edition of the state highway map.

== Major intersections ==
The entire route is in Nye County.

Location	mi	km	Destinations	Notes
	0.000	0.000	SR 361 – Gabbs	
	12.319	19.826	Ione Road	Road continues beyond terminus
1.000 mi = 1.609 km; 1.000 km = 0.621 mi
