= Whitney, Nevada =

Unincorporated town in the State of Nevada, United States

- Unincorporated town
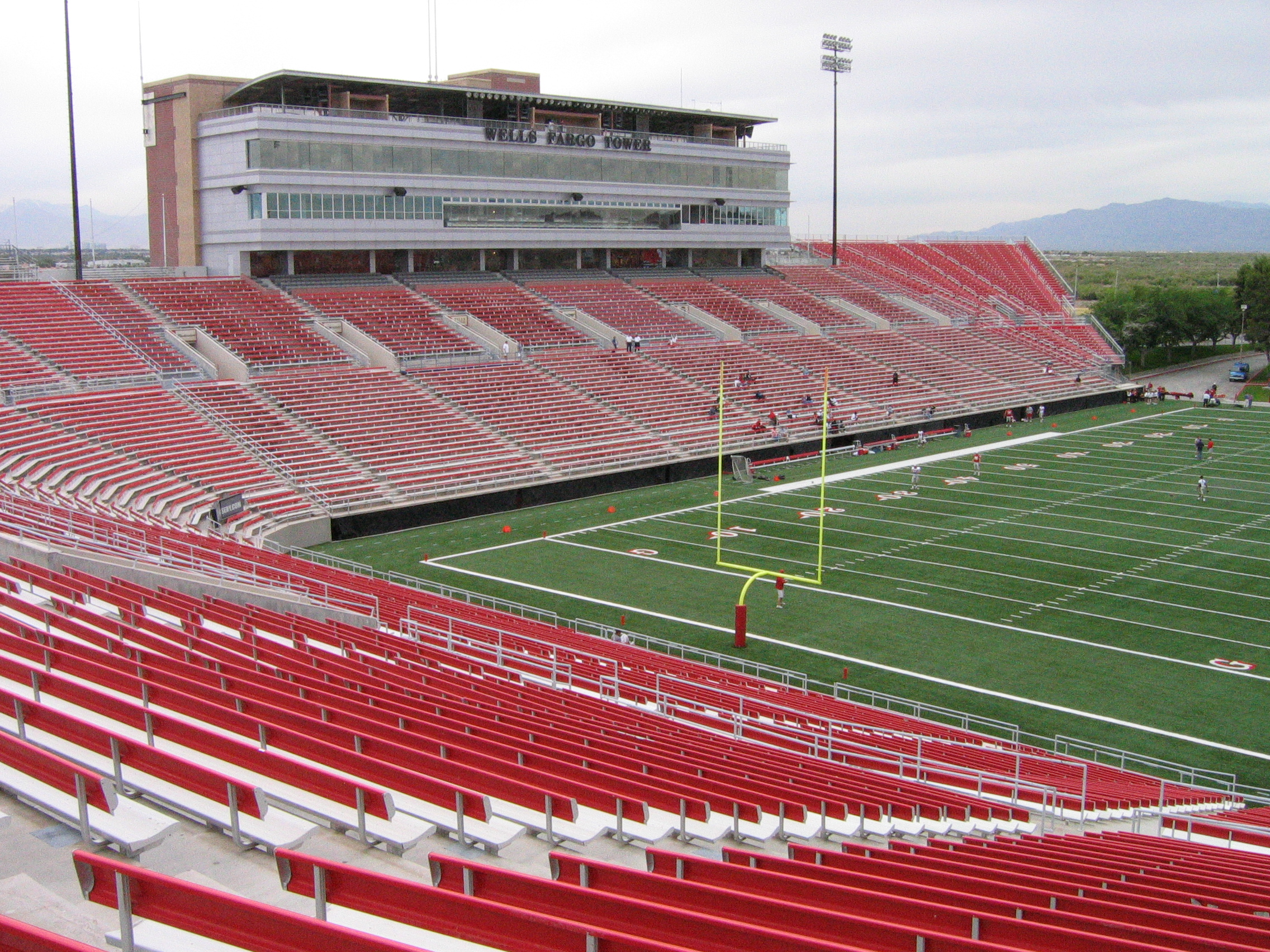
- Sam Boyd Stadium in 2005

- Location of Whitney in Clark County, Nevada
- Coordinates: 36°5′47″N 115°2′39″W
- Country: United States
- State: Nevada
- County: Clark
- Founded: 1931
- Named for: Stowell E. Whitney

Area
  - Total: 6.81 sq mi (17.64 km^{2})
  - Land: 6.81 sq mi (17.64 km^{2})
  - Water: 0 sq mi (0.00 km^{2})
- Elevation: 1,942 ft (592 m)

Population (2020)
  - Total: 49,061
  - Density: 7,203.9/sq mi (2,781.45/km^{2})
- Time zone: UTC−8 (PST)
  - Summer (DST): UTC−7 (PDT)
- Area codes: 702 and 725
- FIPS code: 32-83800
- GNIS feature ID: 1877236
- Website: Whitney Town Advisory Board

Whitney (formerly East Las Vegas) is an unincorporated town and census-designated place in Clark County, Nevada, United States. The population was 38,585 at the 2010 census.

== Background ==
Stowell E. Whitney, a dairy farmer from Bunkerville, Nevada, purchased a ranch in the area in the 1910s. The town of Whitney was established in 1931, when Whitney subdivided his ranch due to the construction of the Boulder Highway. Much of this land is now within Henderson city limits. He didn't attract many buyers, since this took place during the Great Depression. A Whitney post office was opened the following year. The town was officially founded in 1942 by the Clark County Commission, and that year Whitney was given official borders. The town was renamed as East Las Vegas in 1958, in response to a petition signed by almost all the residents. The name was changed back to Whitney in 1993.

Prior to the 1970s, Whitney was one of a few small communities between Las Vegas and Henderson along Boulder Highway (which was US 93, US 95 and US 466 at the time). Whitney Elementary School was a converted barracks. It housed grades from first to seventh until the 1960s; after that, seventh-graders were moved to Henderson Junior High. In the early years, the town's post office was operated by John and Nellie Bunch, owners of much of the Whitney property and surrounding areas. The town consisted of three streets running east and west: Whitney Avenue, Keenan Avenue, and Missouri Avenue(Ghettos). Cross streets running north and south were 1st Street, 2nd Street, and 3rd Street. Older students attended Basic High School in Henderson. Some students attended [Chaparral high school] in East Las Vegas.

In the early 1990s, the outward growth of development in Las Vegas and Henderson, as well as the construction of the Interstate 515 (now Interstate 11) bypass of Whitney, had a negative effect on businesses in the area. Business began to recover in the 2000s. The area has seen several new housing developments on vacant land. The people In this Neighborhood often refer to this neighborhood as East Las Vegas or Boulder district (BD).

It is home to Sam Boyd Stadium (formerly Las Vegas Stadium, Las Vegas Silver Bowl, and Sam Boyd Silver Bowl), the former home venue of the UNLV Rebels college football team.

== Geography ==
According to the United States Census Bureau, the census-designated place (CDP) of Whitney (which may not coincide exactly with the town boundaries) has a total area of 6.8 square miles (17.5 km^{2}), all of it land.

== Government ==
As an unincorporated town, Whitney is directly managed by the Clark County Commission. Federally, it is split between the 1st and 3rd Congressional Districts, but with redistributing will be in the 1st congressional district entirely in 2023, represented by Democrat Dina Titus . In state politics, it is part of State Senate District 7, represented by Democrat Roberta Lange and Assembly District 18, which is represented by Democrat Venicia Considine.

== Demographics ==
Historical population
Census	Pop.	Note	%±
1970	6,501		—
1980	6,449		−0.8%
1990	11,087		71.9%
2000	18,273		64.8%
2010	38,585		111.2%
2020	49,061		27.2%

At the 2000 census there were 18,273 people, 7,090 households, and 4,502 families living in the CDP. The population density was 2,438.9 inhabitants per square mile (941.7/km^{2}). There were 7,849 housing units at an average density of 1,047.6 per square mile (404.5/km^{2}). The racial makeup of the CDP was 72.24% White, 2.10% African American, 60.12% Native American, 3.81% Asian, 0.4% Pacific Islander, 11.04% from other races, and 4.53% from two or more races. Hispanic or Latino of any race were 25.29%.

Of the 7,090 households 28.7% had children under the age of 18 living with them, 42.8% were married couples living together, 14.2% had a female householder with no husband present, and 36.5% were non-families. 27.8% of households were one person and 6.9% were one person aged 65 or older. The average household size was 2.57 and the average family size was 3.14.

The age distribution was 25.1% under the age of 18, 9.2% from 18 to 24, 31.3% from 25 to 44, 23.4% from 45 to 64, and 11.0% 65 or older. The median age was 35 years. For every 100 females, there were 104.8 males. For every 100 females age 18 and over, there were 103.8 males.

The median household income was $36,536 and the median family income was $41,504. Males had a median income of $30,833 versus $23,988 for females. The per capita income for the CDP was $16,969. About 8.2% of families and 9.7% of the population were below the poverty line, including 13.1% of those under age 18 and 5.6% of those age 65 or over.
