= Nevada State Route 91 =

U.S. Route 91 in Nevada

Nevada State Route 91 (1959)

Nevada State Route 91

Nevada State Route 91 may refer to:

- U.S. Route 91 in Nevada, replaced by Interstate 15
- Nevada State Route 91 (1959), which existed until the 1970s renumbering
