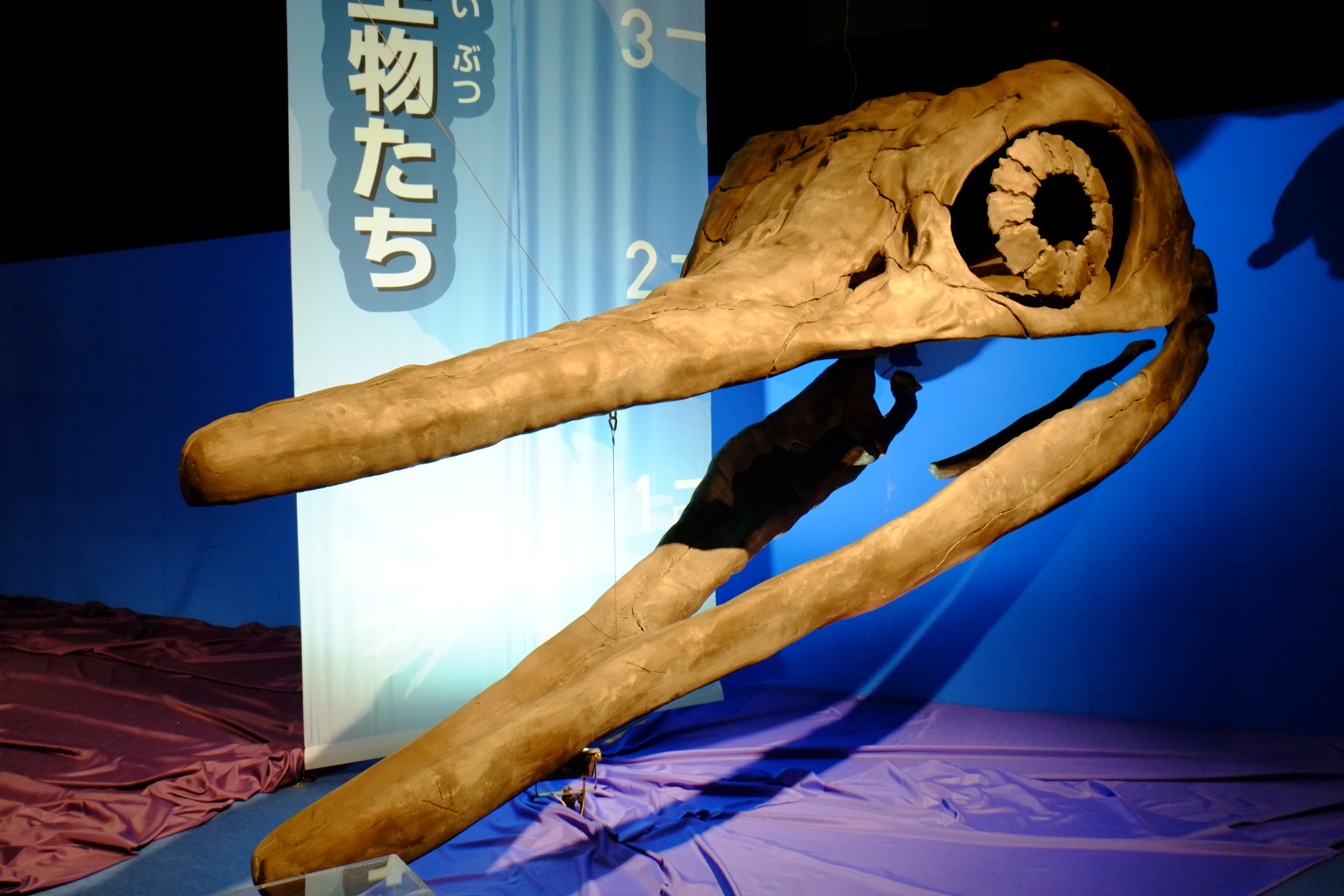
- Restored skull showcased at the Makuhari Messe convention center

Scientific classification
- Kingdom: Animalia
- Phylum: Chordata
- Class: Reptilia
- Order: †Ichthyosauria
- Family: †Shastasauridae
- Genus: †Shonisaurus; Camp, 1976

Type species
- †Shonisaurus popularis Camp, 1976

Species
- †S. popularis Camp, 1976; †S.? sikanniensis Nicholls and Manabe, 2004

= Shonisaurus =

Shonisaurus Temporal range: Late Triassic, Norian

Extinct genus of reptiles

Shonisaurus is a genus of very large ichthyosaurs. At least 37 incomplete fossil specimens of the type species, Shonisaurus popularis, have been found in the Luning Formation of Nevada, United States. This formation dates to the late Carnian-early Norian age of the Late Triassic, around 227 million years ago. Other possible species of Shonisaurus have been discovered from the middle Norian deposits of Canada and Alaska.

== Description ==
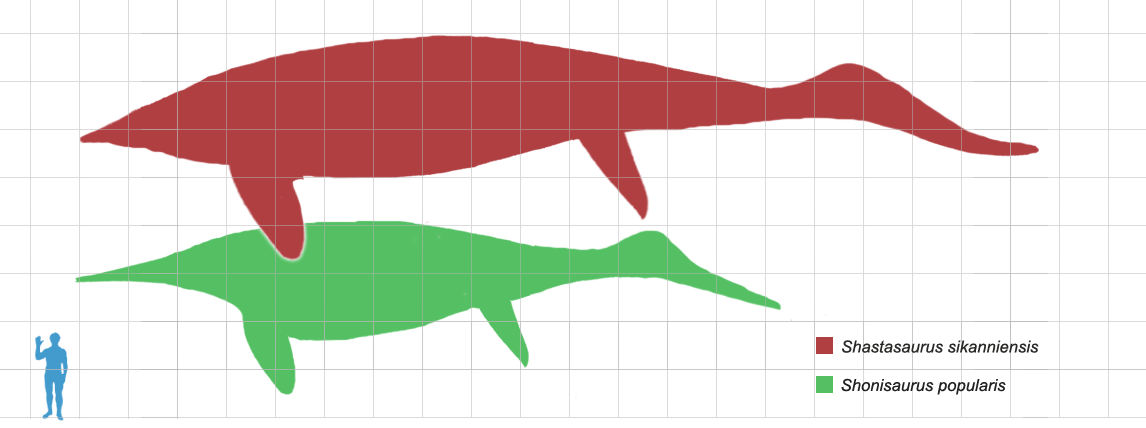
Size of S. popularis (green) and Shastasaurus sikanniensis (red) compared with a human (blue)

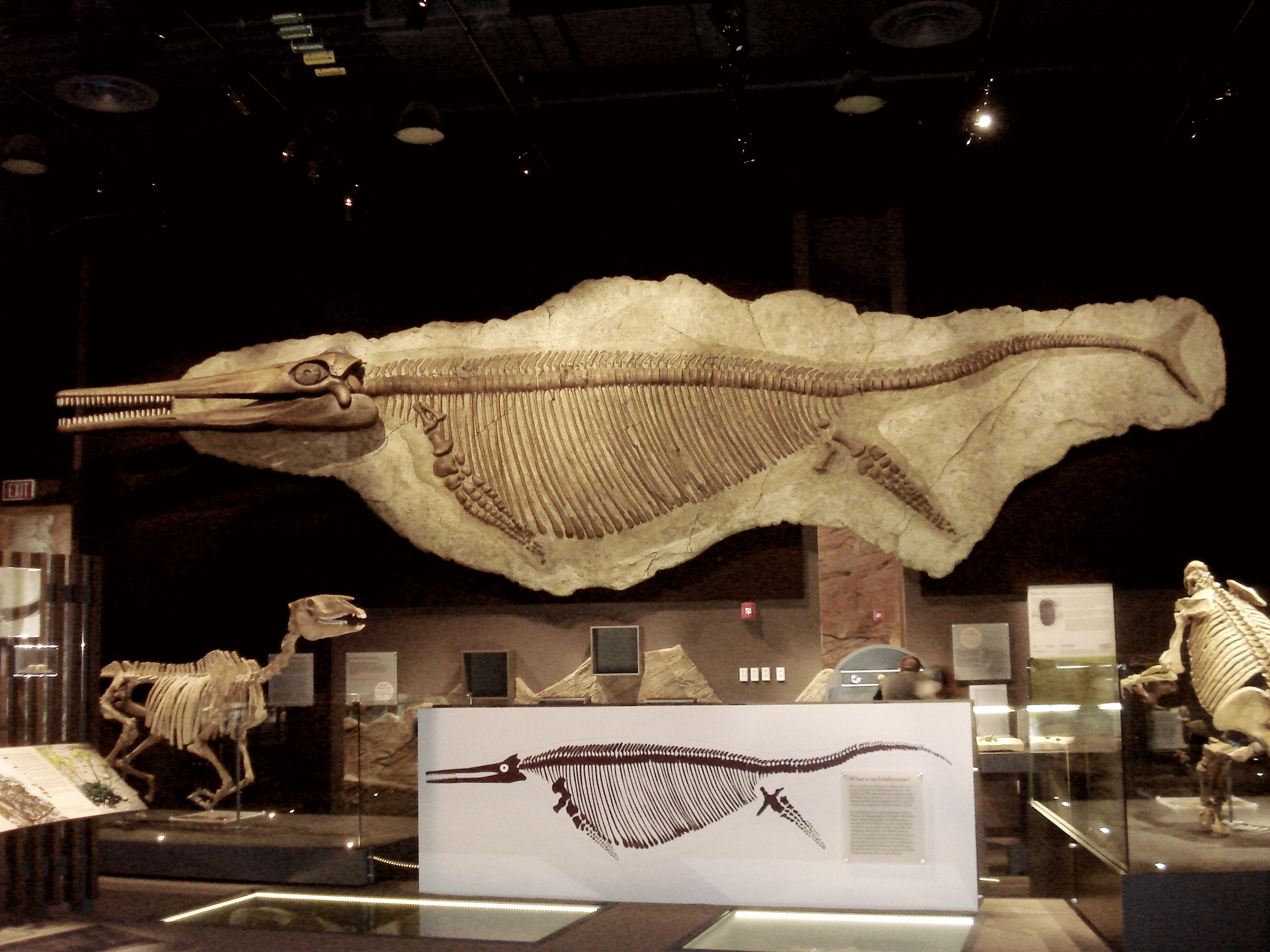
Shonisaurus skeleton, Nevada State Museum

Shonisaurus lived during the late Carnian to Norian stages of the Late Triassic. With a large skull about 2.75 m (9.0 ft) long, S. popularis measured around 13.5–15 metres (44–49 ft) in length and 21.6–29.7 metric tons (23.8–32.7 short tons) in body mass. S. sikanniensis was one of the largest marine reptiles of all time, measuring 21 metres (69 ft) long and weighing 81.5 metric tons (89.8 short tons).

Shonisaurus had a long snout, and its flippers were much longer and narrower than in other ichthyosaurs. While Shonisaurus was initially reported to have had socketed teeth (rather than teeth set in a groove as in more advanced forms), these were present only at the jaw tips, and only in the very smallest, juvenile specimens. All of these features suggest that Shonisaurus may be a relatively specialised offshoot of the main ichthyosaur evolutionary line. More recent finds however indicate that Shonisaurus possessed teeth in all ontogenetic stages. Robust sectorial teeth and gut contents indicate that Shonisaurus was a macrophagous raptorial predator which fed on vertebrates and shelled mollusks like cephalopods, possibly even large-bodied prey. Additionally, Shonisaurus was historically depicted with a rather rotund body, but studies of its body shape since the early 1990s have shown that the body was much more slender than traditionally thought, and had a relatively deep body compared with related marine reptiles.

== History of discovery ==
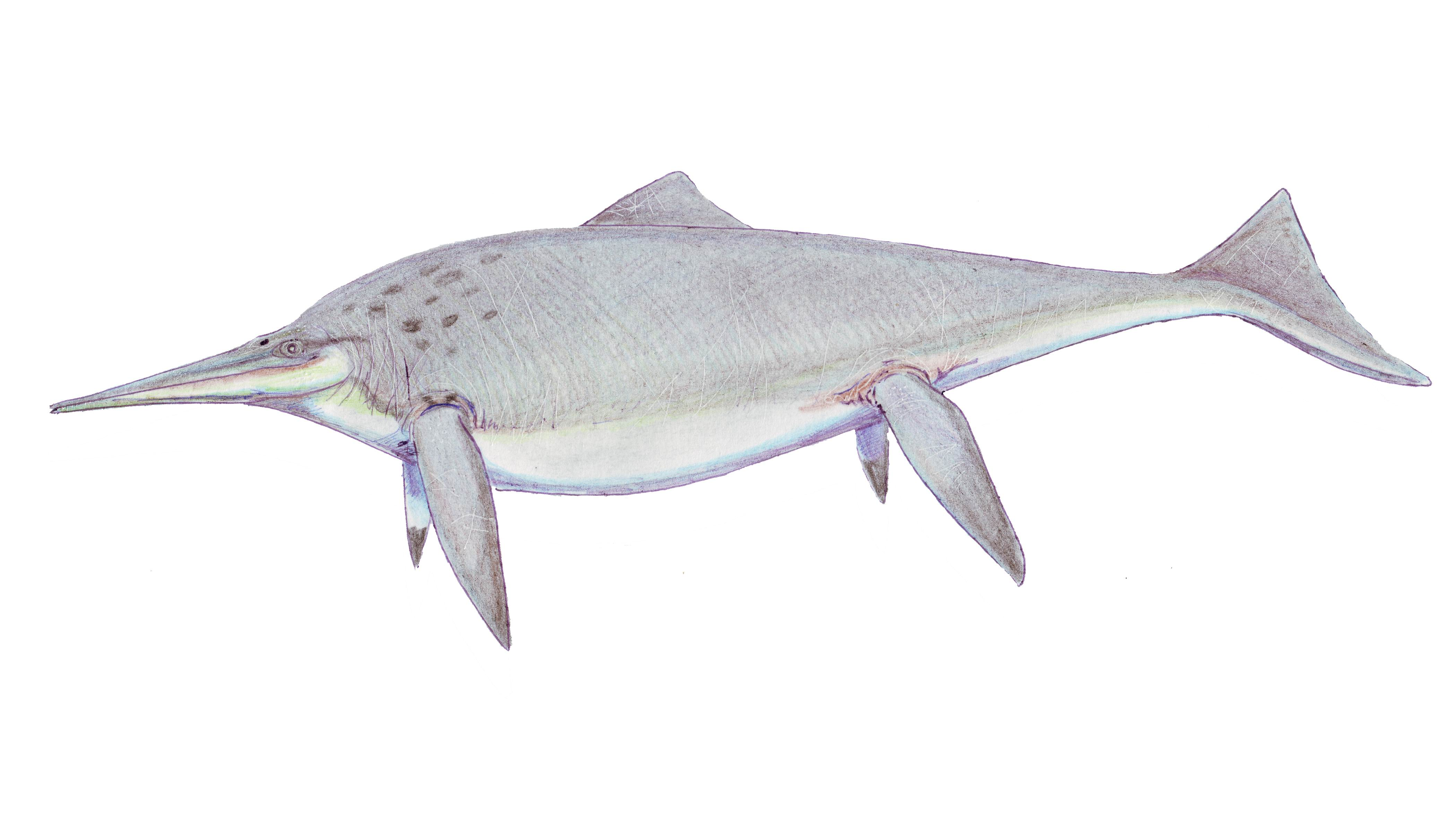
Restoration

Fossils of Shonisaurus were first found in a large deposit in Nevada in 1920. Thirty years later, they were excavated, uncovering the remains of 37 very large ichthyosaurs. These were named Shonisaurus, which means "lizard from the Shoshone Mountains", after the formation where the fossils were found.

S. popularis, was adopted as the state fossil of Nevada in 1984. Excavations, begun in 1954 under the direction of Charles Camp and Samuel Welles of the University of California, Berkeley, were continued by Camp throughout the 1960s. It was named by Charles Camp in 1976. The Nevada fossil sites can currently be viewed at the Berlin-Ichthyosaur State Park.

A second species from the Pardonet Formation of British Columbia was named Shonisaurus sikanniensis in 2004. However, a phylogenetic study by Sander and colleagues in 2011 later showed S. sikanniensis to be a species of Shastasaurus rather than Shonisaurus. A subsequent study by Ji and colleagues published in 2013 reasserted the original classification, finding it more closely related to Shonisaurus than to Shastasaurus. Support for both hypotheses has been found in later studies, with some authors classifying the species in Shonisaurus and others in Shastasaurus.

Specimens belonging to S. sikanniensis have been found in the Pardonet Formation British Columbia, dating to the middle Norian age. An isolated humerus from a smaller individual (TMP 94.381.4) and a postorbital region (TMP 98.75.9) from a juvenile were also reported from the same formation and were referred to as Shonisaurus sp. Other fossils from this formation include the ichthyosaurs Macgowania and Callawayia, coelacanths Whiteia banffensis and possibly Garnbergia, and various genera of molluscs including ammonites and bivalves. Large ichthyosaur remains found in Alaska have also been identified as Shonisaurus sp.

== See also ==
- Largest prehistoric organisms
- Shastasaurus, a relative of and what used to be classified as a species of Shonisaurus
- Temnodontosaurus, another large ichthyosaur
- List of ichthyosaurs
- Timeline of ichthyosaur research
