= Osobb Formation =

Geologic formation in Nevada, United States

- Stratigraphic range: Triassic
- Type: Geological formation

Location
- Region: Nevada
- Country: United States

The Osobb Formation is a geologic formation in Nevada. It preserves fossils dating back to the Triassic period.

== Fossil content ==
=== Cnidarians ===
Cnidarians reported from the Osobb Formation
Genus	Species	Presence	Material	Notes	Images
Ampakabastrea	A. cowichanensis	Augusta Mountain.	3 specimens.	A stony coral also found in Alaska, Vancouver Island & the Luning Formation.	
Ceriostella	C. martini	Augusta Mountain.	One specimen (UMIP 7160).	A stony coral also found in Alaaka & the Luning Formation.	
Coryphyllidae indetermined genus		Augusta Mountain.	A colony fragment (UMIP 7157).	A stony coral.	
Khytrastrea	K. silberlingi	Augusta Mountains.	4 specimens.	A stony coral.	
Margarogyra	M. silberlingi	Augusta Mountain.	2 specimens (UMIP 7165 & 7166).	A stony coral also found in the Luning Formation.	
Nevadoseris	N. punctata	Cain Mountain & Augusta Mountain.	6 specimens.	A stony coral also found in the Luning Formation.	

== See also ==
- List of fossiliferous stratigraphic units in Nevada
- Paleontology in Nevada
