= Ione, Nevada =

- Ghost town
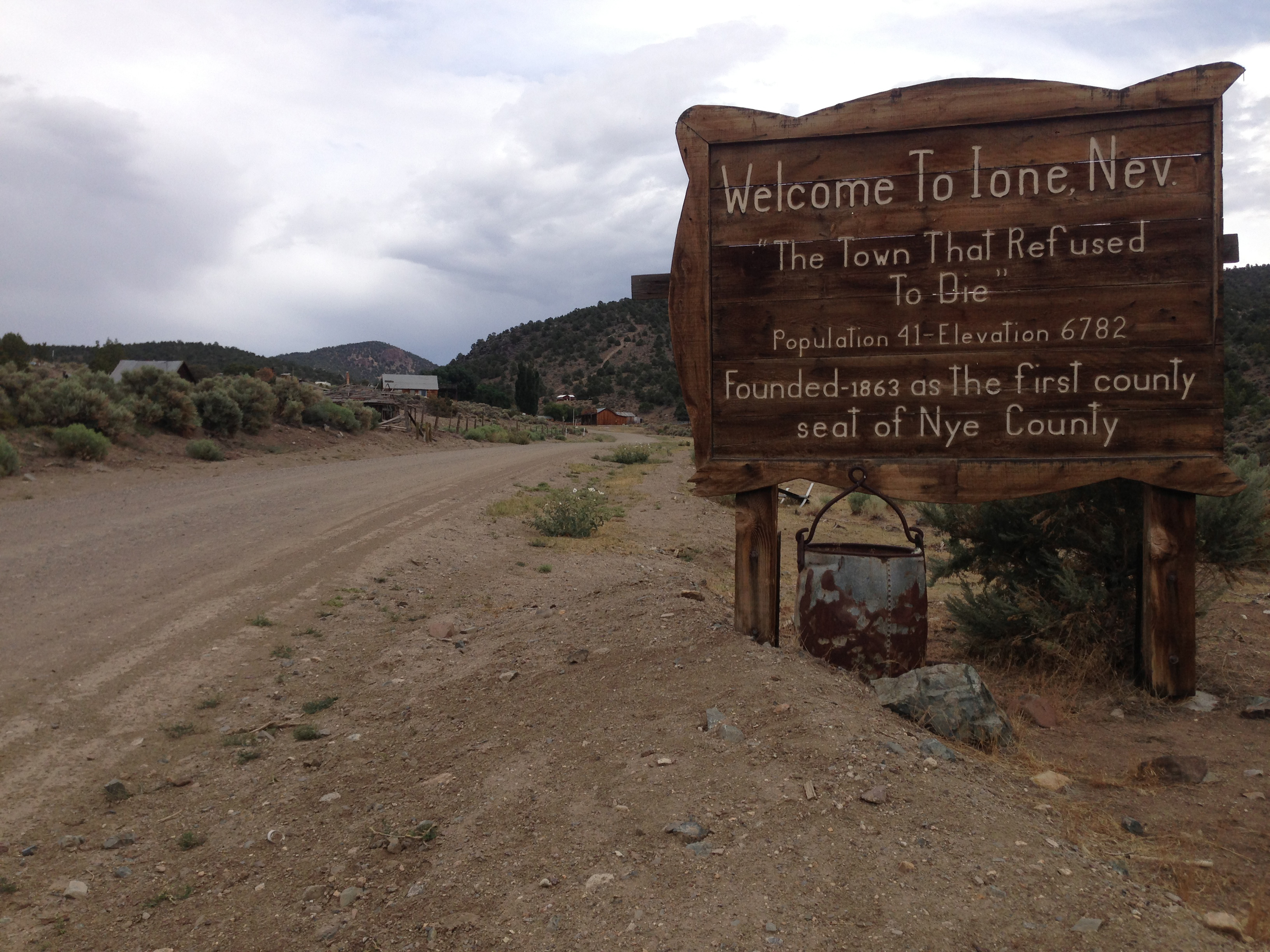
- Sign at the west entrance to Ione

- Location within the state of Nevada Ione (the United States)
- Coordinates: 38°56′54″N 117°35′15″W
- Country: United States
- State: Nevada
- County: Nye
- Time zone: UTC-8 (Pacific (PST))
  - Summer (DST): UTC-7 (PDT)

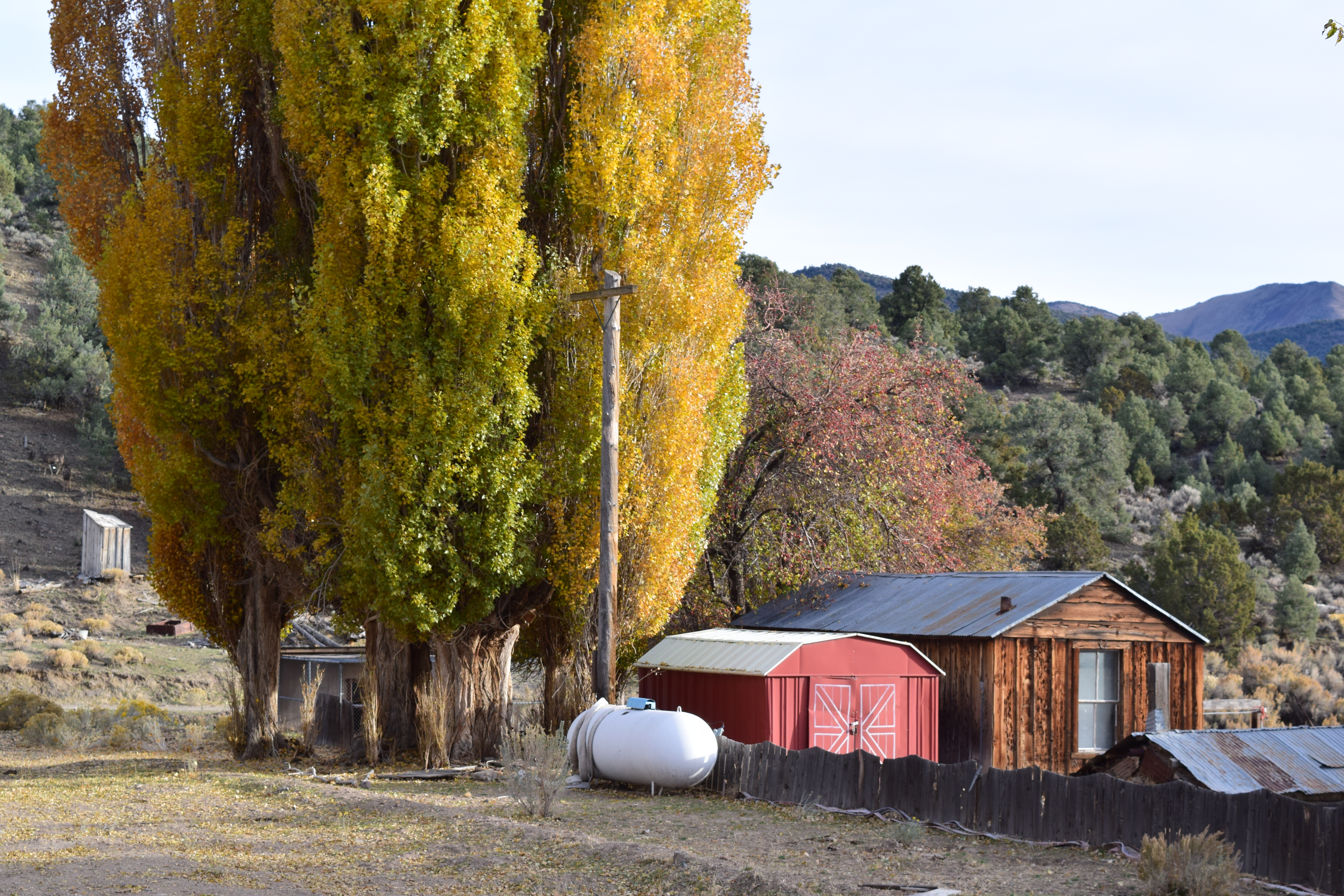
A view within the town

Ione is a ghost town in Nye County, Nevada, located approximately 23 miles (37 km) east of Gabbs, Nevada.

== History ==
=== 19th century ===
Ione came into existence in November 1863 after silver was discovered by P. A. Havens in the Shoshone Range. While most of the mining in the area (the Union Mining District) was closer to communities such as Union and Grantsville, Ione developed as a trade and milling center. Members of the community were shortly petitioning the territorial government for the formation of a new county, and in January 1864, Nye County was organized within the Nevada Territory. Ione was granted a stipend of $800 with which to construct the county's first courthouse.

Within three years, development at Belmont had created enough excitement to lure away a great percentage of Ione's population, and in February 1867, the county seat was removed to that location.

Ione would find its second boom in 1896 when a new 10-stamp mill was built by E. W. Brinell. In 1897, A. Phelps Stokes arrived in the Union District and purchased the majority of the mining and milling interests in the district, further facilitating Ione's resurrection. July 1898 saw a significant drop in the value of silver, and Ione deflated once again.

=== 20th century ===
The town would see one more resurgence, about 1912, when attention was drawn to abundant cinnabar deposits in the area. This last boom was again short lived, ending in 1914, although the recovery of mercury would persist in the district into the 1930s.

The population was 40 in 1940.

Ione's post office closed on April 30, 1959.

In the 1970s, Hugh Marshall purchased most of the town and 24 square miles (62 km^{2}) surrounding it.

== Name ==
Named from the mining district which was organized by P. A. Havens in 1863. He named the new district from a mining district in California. Ione, California's name origin and meaning have never been established. Various legends and conflicting sources exist.

== Climate ==
Climate data for Ione, Nevada, 1991–2020 normals, extremes 1972–present
Month	Jan	Feb	Mar	Apr	May	Jun	Jul	Aug	Sep	Oct	Nov	Dec	Year
Record high °F (°C)	65 (18)	68 (20)	78 (26)	84 (29)	90 (32)	100 (38)	98 (37)	96 (36)	94 (34)	86 (30)	76 (24)	67 (19)	100 (38)
Mean maximum °F (°C)	56.5 (13.6)	58.7 (14.8)	65.6 (18.7)	73.1 (22.8)	81.0 (27.2)	86.8 (30.4)	92.3 (33.5)	90.2 (32.3)	85.6 (29.8)	78.4 (25.8)	67.7 (19.8)	58.5 (14.7)	92.9 (33.8)
Mean daily maximum °F (°C)	41.9 (5.5)	44.6 (7.0)	51.1 (10.6)	56.9 (13.8)	65.4 (18.6)	76.2 (24.6)	84.9 (29.4)	82.2 (27.9)	75.7 (24.3)	63.5 (17.5)	51.1 (10.6)	41.7 (5.4)	61.3 (16.3)
Daily mean °F (°C)	26.6 (−3.0)	29.5 (−1.4)	35.3 (1.8)	39.7 (4.3)	47.7 (8.7)	55.7 (13.2)	63.1 (17.3)	61.1 (16.2)	53.4 (11.9)	42.7 (5.9)	33.1 (0.6)	25.7 (−3.5)	42.8 (6.0)
Mean daily minimum °F (°C)	11.3 (−11.5)	14.3 (−9.8)	19.6 (−6.9)	22.6 (−5.2)	30.0 (−1.1)	35.3 (1.8)	41.3 (5.2)	38.8 (3.8)	31.1 (−0.5)	21.9 (−5.6)	15.2 (−9.3)	9.7 (−12.4)	24.3 (−4.3)
Mean minimum °F (°C)	−10.4 (−23.6)	−3.7 (−19.8)	4.2 (−15.4)	9.8 (−12.3)	16.9 (−8.4)	23.0 (−5.0)	31.3 (−0.4)	28.6 (−1.9)	19.1 (−7.2)	5.9 (−14.5)	−3.3 (−19.6)	−11.0 (−23.9)	−14.5 (−25.8)
Record low °F (°C)	−26 (−32)	−25 (−32)	−12 (−24)	−4 (−20)	6 (−14)	18 (−8)	21 (−6)	20 (−7)	12 (−11)	−9 (−23)	−18 (−28)	−34 (−37)	−34 (−37)
Average precipitation inches (mm)	0.85 (22)	0.44 (11)	0.59 (15)	0.85 (22)	1.08 (27)	0.57 (14)	0.48 (12)	0.44 (11)	0.34 (8.6)	0.62 (16)	0.56 (14)	0.80 (20)	7.62 (192.6)
Average snowfall inches (cm)	6.7 (17)	7.3 (19)	4.9 (12)	7.1 (18)	1.3 (3.3)	0.2 (0.51)	0.0 (0.0)	0.0 (0.0)	0.0 (0.0)	1.9 (4.8)	4.2 (11)	6.5 (17)	40.1 (102.61)
Average precipitation days (≥ 0.01 in)	4.9	5.1	5.7	6.6	6.6	3.9	3.4	2.9	2.6	3.5	3.9	4.9	54.0
Average snowy days (≥ 0.1 in)	3.3	3.6	3.0	3.2	0.8	0.1	0.0	0.0	0.0	0.8	2.3	3.2	20.3
Source 1: NOAA
Source 2: National Weather Service

== Bibliography ==
- Preserving the Glory Days, Shawn Hall: University of Nevada Press, Reno, 1981.
