= Pilot Mountains =

Mountain range in Nevada, United States

- Location within Nevada

Highest point
- Elevation: 2,708 m (8,885 ft)

Geography
- Country: United States
- State: Nevada
- District: Mineral County
- Range coordinates: 38°20′51.735″N 117°58′54.408″W
- Topo map: USGS Eddyville

The Pilot Mountains are a mountain range in Mineral County, Nevada.
