= Grantsville, Nevada =

Former town in Nevada, U.S.

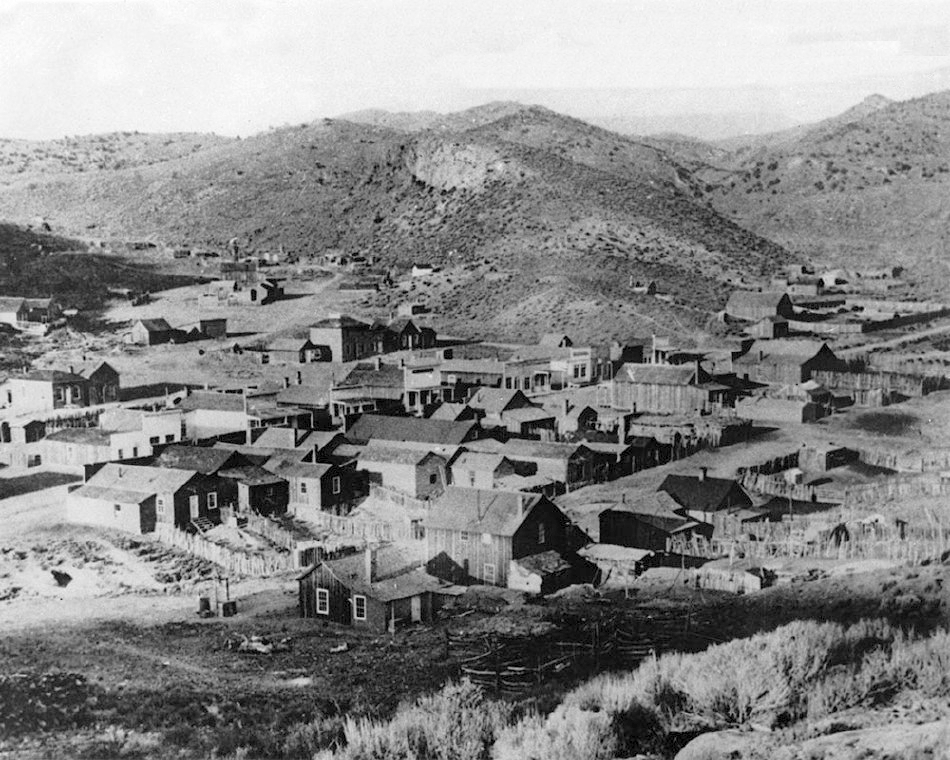
- Grantsville, 1886

- Location within Nevada
- Coordinates: 38°50′44″N 117°34′24″W
- Country: United States
- State: Nevada
- County: Nye
- Named for: Ulysses S. Grant
- Elevation: 7,024 ft (2,141 m)
- Time zone: UTC-8 (Pacific)
  - Summer (DST): UTC-7 (PDT)

Grantsville is a former town in Nye County, Nevada.

The camp was started in 1863 or 1864, along with the nearby Union and North Union mining districts. The camp was named by Unionists to honor Ulysses S. Grant. In 1864, miners in the district successfully petitioned to have Nye County separated from Esmeralda County, Nevada.

The Grantsville post office was in operation from February 1879 until October 1901.

The Alexander and McMahon mines were in operation in the area in 1880 and 1881. In 1877 the Alexander Co. built a 20-stamp mill, which was enlarged to 40 stamps in 1880.
