= Middlegate, Nevada =

Unincorporated community in Nevada, US

- Unincorporated community
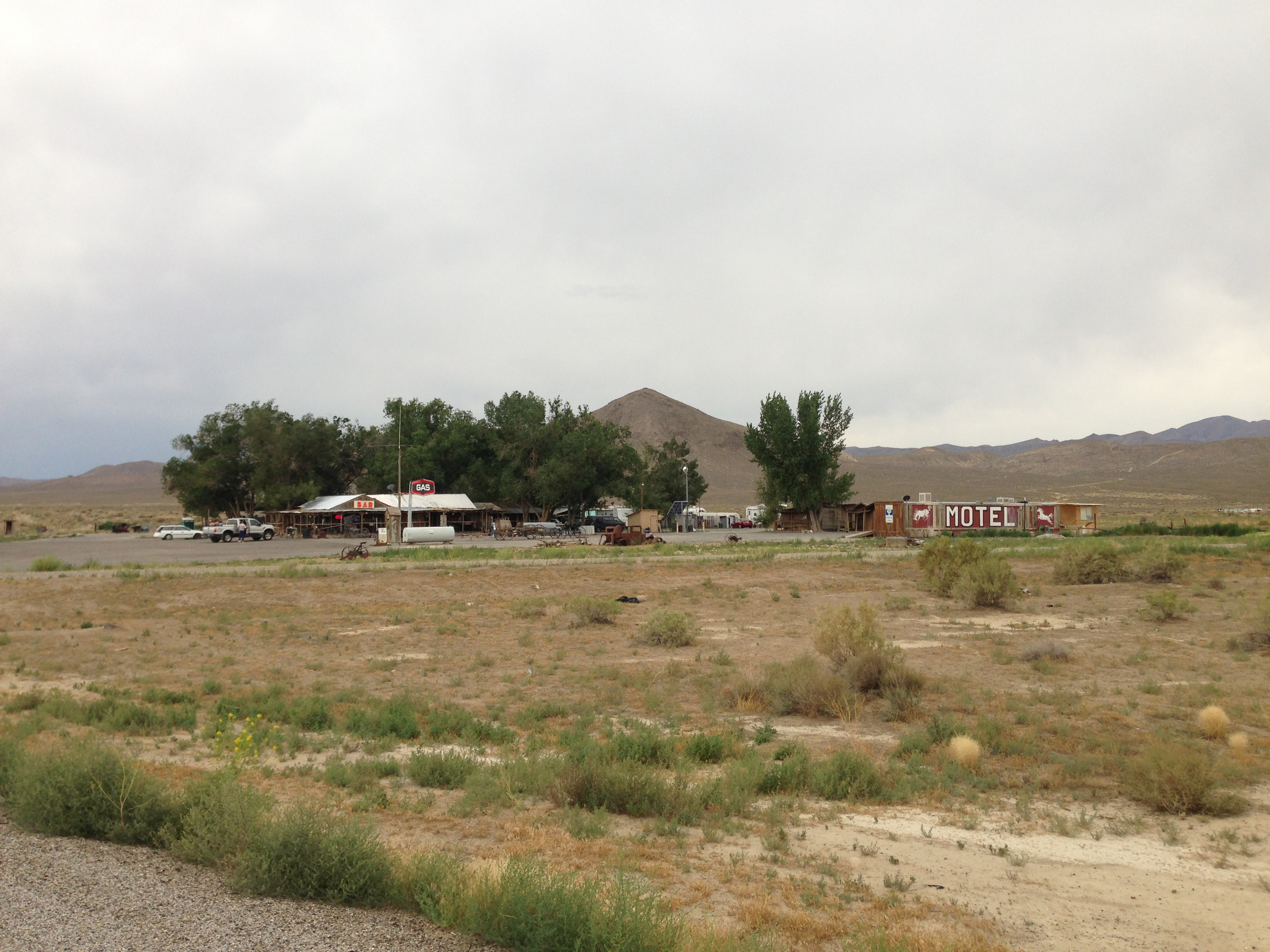

- Location within Nevada
- Coordinates: 39°17′16″N 118°01′35″W
- Country: United States
- State: Nevada
- County: Churchill
- Elevation: 4,610 ft (1,410 m)

Population (2016)
  - Total: 17
- Time zone: UTC-8 (Pacific (PST))
  - Summer (DST): UTC-7 (PDT)
- Area code: 775
- GNIS feature ID: 856080
- Nearby highways: US 50, NV 361

Middlegate is an unincorporated community along "The Loneliest Road In America," U.S. Route 50, in Churchill County, Nevada, United States.

== Middlegate Station ==
Middlegate Station is a rest stop/commercial area with a gas station, bar and restaurant, motel and RV park.

Stephen King stayed at the Middlegate Station motel for seven days and wrote a portion of Desperation.

== Transportation ==
Middlegate is served by intersecting U.S. Route 50 (Austin Highway/"The Loneliest Road In America") and Nevada State Route 361 (Gabbs Valley Road) along with multiple unpaved roads giving access to the surrounding ranches.

A former portion of the Lincoln Highway intersects with Gabbs Valley Road at Middlegate Station. It was also a stop on the Pony Express.

== Shoe Tree ==
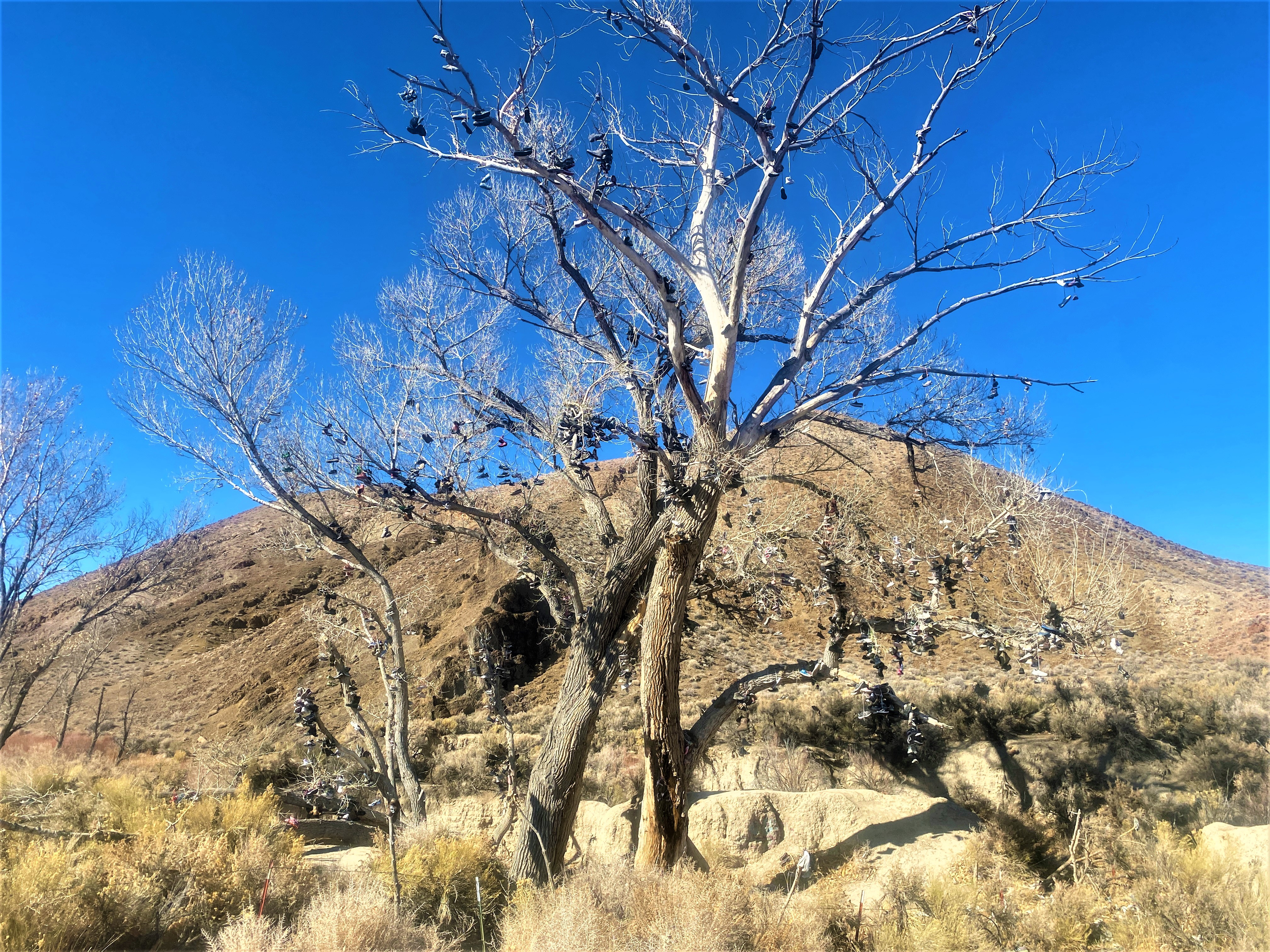
New Shoe Tree

Immediately to the east of Middlegate on the northern side of Route 50 is a notable tree, known locally as the "Shoe Tree," with several dozen pairs of shoes hanging from its branches. The original Shoe Tree was cut down by vandals on December 30, 2010). Since that time, a nearby tree has been decorated with shoes.
