= Unincorporated towns in Nevada =

Nevada state law allows for governance of unincorporated towns under two different systems. The Unincorporated Town Government Law, adopted in 1975, applies to counties of 100,000 people or more, and any other county that opts in. For other counties, a patchwork system of laws applies.

A 1974 study by the state Legislative Commission identified 39 unincorporated towns in Nevada. As of 2026, the Nevada Department of Taxation lists 47 unincorporated towns. Elko County websites and ordinances continue to refer to the Unincorporated Town of Jarbidge, though it does not appear on the Department of Taxation's 2025 list of unincorporated towns. Altogether, a total of 48 unincorporated towns are presumably active as of 2026.

There appears to be a distinction between the act of creating an unincorporated town and the act of establishing a separate governing body for such a jurisdiction. For instance, Clark County established Enterprise as an unincorporated town by ordinance in 1996, but a separate county ordinance creating an appointed advisory board was approved in 2003.

Uncontested seats for unincorporated town advisory boards may not be placed on the ballot of any election.

== Unincorporated Town Government Law ==
The Unincorporated Town Government Law, adopted in 1975, applies to counties with a population over 100,000 (Clark and Washoe Counties), and any other county whose commissioners pass an ordinance adopting the law.

Under this law, unincorporated towns are provided extra services by the county, paid for by property taxes or other revenue sources from the town. A town can be formed by an initiative petition by residents, or by the county commissioners.

A town advisory board is impaneled for each town. The county commissioners may choose for the town advisory board to be elected by town residents, or appointed by the commissioners. In either case, the commissioners may remove a board member at any time.

The advisory board is responsible for acting as a liaison between the residents and the county commissioners, and advising the commissioners on budgets and local ordinances. The commissioners may delegate to the advisory board management of local services and expenditures.

== Legal framework in other counties ==
In counties where the Unincorporated Town Government Law does not apply, a town board may be established for an unincorporated town, either by initiative petition or act of the county commissioners. The five-member board is elected by residents.

The county commission may levy a property tax of up to 1.5% on all property in the town. This tax, and other town revenue, is placed in a town fund administered by the county, to be used only for the benefit of the town.

Many town government functions can be exercised jointly by the town board or the county commissioners, such as providing local services, adopting ordinances, regulating businesses, establishing police and fire departments, and issuing bonds.

As an alternative to a town board, county commissioners may create a citizens' advisory council for an unincorporated town. The three-to-five-member council is appointed by commissioners after an "informal election". The council acts in an advisory and liaison capacity, and does not affect the responsibilities of the commissioners.

The option to establish a town board was enacted in 1967. The system was unpopular, because of an impractical provision that required two county commissioners to sit on the town board; by 1975, it had been adopted by only one town, Crescent Valley. The citizens' advisory council provision was passed into law in 1973. The town board law was later amended in 1985 to remove the requirement of county commissioners serving on the board.

According to Clark County, "In Nevada, County Commissioners are the legally constituted town boards for all unincorporated towns. While all official governmental decisions are made by the Board of County Commissioners, each unincorporated town has a Town Advisory Board (TAB) which assists the Board of County Commissioners by providing input on matters of importance to its community. These issues range from community parks and neighborhood improvements to zoning, traffic, and street maintenance. In addition, six Citizens Advisory Councils (CAC) serve in a similar capacity for communities located outside the boundaries of unincorporated towns".

== List of Unincorporated Town Governments with Population Over Time ==
#	Name	County	Status	2005	2006	2007	2008	2009	Census 2010	2010	2011	2012	2013	2014	2015	2016	2017	2018	2019	Census 2020	2020	2021	2022	2023	2024	2025	Type of Governing Body	Establishment of Governing Body	Legal source	Seats and Term	Selection	Website
1	Bunkerville	Clark	Active	1198	1179	1255	1160	1222	1256	1255	1199	1084	1067	1039	1097	1096	1042	1049	1060	1010	1044	987	942	925	934	944	Unincorporated Town Government under NRS 269.500	2003	Predates the unincorporated town statutes. Clark County Ord. 3004 § 1 (part) 2003, Ord. No. 4352, § 2, 11-17-2015.	5 seats, 2 years	Elected	None, information posted by Clark County
2	Enterprise	Clark	Active	95377	119100	143917	149713	150473	165435	165285	160632	162872	170699	174064	183755	188503	193572	206266	211761	213073	220237	222522	234517	243834	249741	259959	Unincorporated Town Government under NRS 269.500	2003	Clark County Ord. 3004 § 1 (part) 2003, Ord. No. 4352, § 2, 11-17-2015	5 seats, 2 years	Appointed, with potential consideration of town poll results	None, information posted by Clark County.
3	Indian Springs	Clark	Active	1679	1907	1659	1488	1447	1357	1356	1169	1192	1203	1220	1235	1259	1264	1138	1283	1279	1322	1108	1411	1547	1534	1508	Unincorporated Town Government under NRS 269.500	2003	Clark County Ord. 3004 § 1 (part) 2003, Ord. No. 4352, § 2, 11-17-2015	5 seats, 2 years	Appointed, with potential consideration of town poll results	None, information posted by Clark County.
4	Laughlin	Clark	Active	8226	8458	8807	8761	7914	7874	7867	7166	8414	8835	8963	9186	9380	9672	10017	10001	9971	10306	9313	8990	8888	8858	8810	Unincorporated Town Government under NRS 269.500	2003	Clark County Ord. 3004 § 1 (part) 2003, Ord. No. 4352, § 2, 11-17-2015	5 seats, 2 years	Elected	None, information posted by Clark County.
5	Moapa	Clark	Active	1261	1003	1201	998	1052	1061	1060	1390	1086	1094	1352	1363	1370	1026	1433	1430	1374	1420	1274	1311	1278	1276	1067	Unincorporated Town Government under NRS 269.500	2003	Clark County Ord. 3004 § 1 (part) 2003, Ord. No. 4352, § 2, 11-17-2015	5 seats, 2 years	Elected	None, information posted by Clark County.
6	Moapa Valley	Clark	Active	6726	6845	8085	7134	7269	7503	7496	7647	6868	6871	6851	6875	6967	7115	7231	7368	7215	7458	6163	6335	6292	6242	6277	Unincorporated Town Government under NRS 269.500	2003	Clark County Ord. 3004 § 1 (part) 2003, Ord. No. 4352, § 2, 11-17-2015	5 seats, 2 years	Elected	None, information posted by Clark County.
7	Mount Charleston	Clark	Active	879	806	1179	1118	1061	1069	1068	655	647	651	635	653	665	666	682	700	661	683	735	732	747	738	684	Unincorporated Town Government under NRS 269.500	2003	Clark County Ord. 3004 § 1 (part) 2003, Ord. No. 4352, § 2, 11-17-2015	5 seats, 2 years	Appointed, with potential consideration of town poll results	None, information posted by Clark County.
8	Paradise	Clark	Active	191650	186370	185935	182264	178974	185472	185304	181635	184745	187949	191047	192810	191705	193712	196586	200698	195245	201810	192552	190003	189229	188387	191215	Unincorporated Town Government under NRS 269.500	2003	Predates the unincorporated town statutes. Clark County Ord. 3004 § 1 (part) 2003, Ord. No. 4352, § 2, 11-17-2015	5 seats, 2 years	Appointed, with potential consideration of town poll results	None, information posted by Clark County.
9	Searchlight	Clark	Active	1088	764	798	750	718	744	743	571	395	397	344	347	356	364	367	382	377	390	442	439	413	416	413	Unincorporated Town Government under NRS 269.500	2003	Predates the unincorporated town statutes. Clark County Ord. 3004 § 1 (part) 2003, Ord. No. 4352, § 2, 11-17-2015.	5 seats, 2 years	Elected	None, information posted by Clark County
10	Spring Valley	Clark	Active	165335	172110	176815	176910	174458	176872	176712	172483	184910	188818	191342	197958	211232	216228	224158	226723	222388	229865	214862	218452	219492	224164	227835	Unincorporated Town Government under NRS 269.500	2003	Clark County Ord. 3004 § 1 (part) 2003, Ord. No. 4352, § 2, 11-17-2015	5 seats, 2 years	Appointed, with potential consideration of town poll results	None, information posted by Clark County.
11	Summerlin (South)	Clark	Inactive	20256	21692	26415	27992	28342	29694	29667	25141	25260	26855	27244	28300	30013	30492	31894	32199	31977	33052	32957	33015	34256	34532	35593	Unincorporated town administered directly by county	No town government established	No town government established	Clark County Commission is the governing body	Clark County Commission is the governing body	None
12	Sunrise Manor	Clark	Active	186511	191858	191966	185745	179808	175365	175206	191007	196570	199754	202710	206720	209932	210216	213341	216021	209310	216348	210189	210610	209587	208974	212012	Unincorporated Town Government under NRS 269.500	2003	Predates the unincorporated town statutes. Clark County Ord. 3004 § 1 (part) 2003, Ord. No. 4352, § 2, 11-17-2015	5 seats, 2 years	Appointed, with potential consideration of town poll results	None, information posted by Clark County.
13	Whitney	Clark	Active	27155	33144	36182	36164	37690	37637	37603	39122	38910	39857	40567	41662	44110	44449	45419	46328	45014	46528	47426	46256	45901	46606	47407	Unincorporated Town Government under NRS 269.500	2003	Clark County Ord. 3004 § 1 (part) 2003, Ord. No. 4352, § 2, 11-17-2015	5 seats, 2 years	Appointed, with potential consideration of town poll results	None, information posted by Clark County.
14	Winchester	Clark	Active	35208	34874	37561	37141	35235	35174	35142	33329	31634	31960	32413	32770	32972	33065	33402	34095	33153	34268	34749	34064	33402	33366	33894	Unincorporated Town Government under NRS 269.500	2003	Predates the unincorporated town statutes. Clark County Ord. 3004 § 1 (part) 2003, Ord. No. 4352, § 2, 11-17-2015	5 seats, 2 years	Appointed, with potential consideration of town poll results	None, information posted by Clark County.
15	Gardnerville	Douglas	Active	5165	5550	5394	5412	5250	4756	4983	5469	5495	5541	5760	5751	5780	5693	5874	6036	5982	5933	6188	5553	5667	5750	5940	Unincorporated town government under NRS 269.500	1980	Predates the unincorporated town statutes. Douglas County Ord. 351, § 4(part), 1980.	5 seats, 4 years	Elected	Town of Gardnerville official website
16	Genoa	Douglas	Active	248	252	252	255	256	233	244	216	219	220	217	215	213	213	219	220	220	218	213	215	217	222	224	Unincorporated town government under NRS 269.500	1980	Predates the unincorporated town statutes Douglas County Ord. 351, § 2(part), 1980	5 seats, 4 years	Elected	Town of Genoa official website
17	Minden	Douglas	Active	2983	3234	3239	3261	3229	3067	3213	2984	3010	2993	3072	3072	3110	3191	3270	3293	3321	3294	3460	3323	3559	3856	4088	Unincorporated town government under NRS 269.500	1980	Predates the unincorporated town statutes Douglas County Ord. 351 §3 (part), 1980	5 seats, 4 years	Elected	Town of Minden official website
18	Jackpot	Elko	Active	1273	1293	1217	1222	1184	1103	1197	963	914	923	907	898	897	860	865	978	958	961	944	1148	1169	1167	1143	Unincorporated Town Government under NRS 269.500	1982	Predates the unincorporated town statutes. Town established by Elko County Ord. 1980-T, 10-9-1980, eff. 10-30-1980. Town government established by Elko County Ord. 1982-K, 9-8-82, eff. 10-1-82; amd. Ord. 1984 H, 9-13-84, eff. 10-1-84.	5 seats, 2 years	Appointed	Town of Jackpot official website
19	Jarbidge	Elko	Active																								Unincorporated Town Government under NRS 269.500	1993	Town established by Elko County Ord. 1993-E, 8-18-1993, eff. 9-1-1993. Town government established by Elko County Ord. 1993-R, 12-12-93, eff. 12-20-93.	3 seats, 2 years	Appointed	None, information posted by Elko County
20	Montello	Elko	Active	181	175	165	165	167	156	169	79	60	60	56	56	62	63	63	64	61	61	60	63	65	60	60	Unincorporated Town Government under NRS 269.500	1982	Predates the unincorporated town statutes. Elko County Ord. 1982-K, 9-8-82, eff. 10-1-82; amd. Ord. 1984-H, 9-13-84, eff. 10-1-84.	5 seats, 2 years	Appointed	
21	Mountain City	Elko	Active	121	125	129	130	121	112	122	102	110	109	107	100	95	87	74	81	75	75	74	104	103	95	82	Citizens' Advisory Council under NRS 269.024, confirmed by name	1982	Predates the unincorporated town statutes. Elko County Ord. 1982-K, 9-8-82, eff. 10-1-82.	5 seats, 2 years	Appointed After Informal Election	None, information posted by Elko County
22	Goldfield	Esmeralda	Unknown	438	430	448	415	441	274	400	288	259	293	272	262	260	263	274	282	210	288	292	324	345	364	373	Unknown	Unknown	Predates the unincorporated town statutes.	Unknown	Unknown	None
23	Silver Peak	Esmeralda	Unknown	126	117	125	182	141	88	129	117	128	132	128	133	123	122	101	100	74	101	91	88	69	72	74	Unknown	Unknown	Predates the unincorporated town statutes.	Unknown	Unknown	None
24	Crescent Valley	Eureka	Active	311	292	289	282.76446	283	366	296	396	370	371	374	374	372	380	367	381	355	370	376	309	297	309	303	Unincorporated Town Government under NRS 269.500	2011	Predates the unincorporated town statutes.	3 seats, 2 years	Elected	None, information posted by Eureka County
25	Eureka	Eureka	Active	440	433	431	473	483	616	499	611	717	720	691	697	732	701	734	717	671	701	684	657	635	657	650	Unincorporated town administered directly by county	No town government established	Predates the unincorporated town statutes. Town retroactively ratified by Eureka County Ord. Chapter 10.010. No town government established.	Eureka County Commission is the governing body, advised by the Eureka Townsite Annexation Advisory Committee	Eureka County Commission is the governing body, advised by the Eureka Townsite Annexation Advisory Committee	None
26	Austin	Lander	Unknown	288	287	275	309	304	301	312	171	173	169	170	166	166	166	167	156	143	158	153	163	153	170	163	Unknown	Unknown	Predates the unincorporated town statutes	Unknown	Unknown	None
27	Battle Mountain	Lander	Unknown	2692	2740	2845	2922	2967	2816	2922	3326	3421	3657	3804	3573	3559	3473	3387	3391	3157	3482	3424	3158	3159	3261	3122	Unknown	Unknown	Predates the unincorporated town statutes	Unknown	Unknown	None
28	Kingston	Lander	Active	288	306	309	320	331	316	328	125	124	124	128	120	136	123	123	122	117	129	126	125	126	135	125	Unknown	Unknown	Unknown	Unknown	Unknown	None, information posted by Lander County
29	Alamo	Lincoln	Active	428	432	427	464	455	608	503	627	583	583	578	580	660	673	684	686	596	707	591	721	648	656	646			Predates the unincorporated town statutes.			
30	Panaca	Lincoln	Active	562	558	595	645	659	757	626	781	832	811	797	783	798	797	810	811	695	824	841	861	872	847	850			Predates the unincorporated town statutes.			
31	Pioche	Lincoln	Active	698	703	791	785	837	1014	839	933	810	790	784	744	773	784	797	798	683	809	810	1020	1062	1049	1001			Predates the unincorporated town statutes.			
32	Hawthorne	Mineral	Active	2956	2931	2960	2970	3028	3409	3194	3008	3086	3076	3023	3035	2868	3066	3065	3100	2969	3192	3152	3236	3214	3164	3161			Predates the unincorporated town statutes.			
33	Luning	Mineral	Active	87	81	79	80	79	83	78	88	99	100	98	101	123	105	106	107	91	98	92	102	103	86	78			Predates the unincorporated town statutes.			
34	Mina	Mineral	Active	276	218	205	207	207	190	178	129	162	163	160	153	173	173	174	174	166	179	154	144	132	117	118			Predates the unincorporated town statutes.			
35	Walker Lake	Mineral	Active	310	319	299	305	316	339	318	307	349	346	329	378	403	322	327	330	313	337	317	263	261	261	245						
36	Amargosa	Nye	Active	1383	1435	1503	1521	1392	1442	1492	1331	1353	1342	1426	1396	1390	1344	1327	1327	1527	1433	1401	1783	1836	1662	1659						
37	Beatty	Nye	Active	1032	1025	1059	1024	880	893	924	979	1011	966	975	973	950	961	974	998	996	935	959	1059	1099	1049	1028			Predates the unincorporated town statutes.			Town of Beatty official website
38	Gabbs	Nye	Active	312	313	322	332	316	294	304	282	271	259	245	231	226	218	220	221	142	133	209	223	218	199	190						
39	Manhattan	Nye	Active	124	122	140	138	135	129	133	121	125	124	133	134	130	126	128	138	142	133	130	142	146	66	64			Predates the unincorporated town statutes.			
40	Pahrump	Nye	Active	33241	36645	37928	38882	38247	36538	37796	36995	36593	37030	37626	38482	38238	39023	40473	41069	44204	41482	41940	42828	43984	43563	43690			Predates the unincorporated town statutes.			
41	Round Mountain	Nye	Active	744	787	831	850	837	779	806	771	809	822	846	837	799	772	768	763	793	744	734	765	803	706	669			Predates the unincorporated town statutes.			
42	Tonopah	Nye	Active	2607	2600	2610	2628	2580	2405	2488	2346	2552	2593	2578	2345	2291	2311	2259	2163	1942	1823	2170	2493	2722	2851	3086			Predates the unincorporated town statutes.			
43	Imlay	Pershing	Active	223	228	233	243	233	233	233	160	186	244	257	196	208	207	203	208	217	221	212	216	222	225	227		1988	Pershing County Ord. 94 §2(A), 1988			
44	Gold Hill	Storey	Active	191	203	209	212	207	191	202	238	204	200	201	201	204	202	207	206	212	222	212	228	229	225	225			Predates the unincorporated town statutes.			
45	Virginia City	Storey	Active	938	954	1011	1027	1011	945	998	859	830	841	832	831	845	850	887	904	759	796	932	918	900	896	897			Predates the unincorporated town statutes.			
46	Lund	White Pine	Active	156	162	164	157	158	178	162	207	206	206	208	197	202	205	206	205	170	205	208	207	205	214	208			Predates the unincorporated town statutes.			
47	McGill	White Pine	Active	1109	1145	1125	1128	1109	1215	1108	1168	1175	1177	1200	1161	1166	1191	1186	1187	1007	1211	1201	1184	1148	1167	1169			Predates the unincorporated town statutes.			
48	Ruth	White Pine	Active	394	405	400	407	402	437	399	420	418	424	429	434	437	450	448	455	366	440	432	430	416	423	423			Predates the unincorporated town statutes.			
49	East Las Vegas	?	Inactive?																										Predates the unincorporated town statutes.			
50	Fernley	?	Inactive?																										Predates the unincorporated town statutes.			
51	Logandale	Clark County	Merged to form Moapa Valley																										Predates the unincorporated town statutes.			
52	Mesquite	Clark County	Incorporated as city																								Unincorporated town board, unknown	Unknown	Predates the unincorporated town statutes. Unknown.	Unknown	Unknown	N/A
53	Overton	Clark County	Merged to form Moapa Valley																										Predates the unincorporated town statutes.			
54	Silver City	?	Inactive?																										Predates the unincorporated town statutes.			
55	Glendale	Clark	Dissolved																								Unknown	Unknown, dissolved ca. 2001	Clark County Ord. 615	5 seats, term unknown	Unknown	Unknown
57	West Wendover	Clark	Converted to incorporated city?																								Unincorporated town					
58	Gold Circle		Renamed to Midas in 1909, Converted to incorporated city?																								Unincorporated town					

== List of Citizens' Advisory Councils ==
#	Name	County	Status	Type	Legally Established	Legal source	Seats and Term	Selection	Website
1	Goodsprings	Clark County	Active	Citizens' Advisory Council under N.R.S. 244.1945	1980	Clark County Ord. 720 § 1 (part), 1980	Unknown	Unknown	None, information posted by Clark County.
2	Lone Mountain	Clark County	Active	Citizens' Advisory Council under N.R.S. 244.1945	1980	Clark County Ord. 720 § 1 (part), 1980	Unknown	Unknown	None, information posted by Clark County.
3	Lower Kyle Canyon	Clark County	Active	Citizens' Advisory Council under N.R.S. 244.1945	1980	Clark County Ord. 720 § 1 (part), 1980	Unknown	Unknown	None, information posted by Clark County.
4	Mountain Springs	Clark County	Active	Citizens' Advisory Council under N.R.S. 244.1945	1980	Clark County Ord. 720 § 1 (part), 1980	Unknown	Unknown	None, information posted by Clark County.
4	Red Rock	Clark County	Active	Citizens' Advisory Council under N.R.S. 244.1945	1980	Clark County Ord. 720 § 1 (part), 1980	Unknown	Unknown	None, information posted by Clark County.
5	Sandy Valley	Clark County	Active	Citizens' Advisory Council under N.R.S. 244.1945	1980	Clark County Ord. 720 § 1 (part), 1980	Unknown	Unknown	None, information posted by Clark County.
