= Gabbs Valley Range =

Mountain range in Nevada, United States

- Location within Nevada

Highest point
- Elevation: 2,209 m (7,247 ft)

Naming
- Etymology: Gabbs Valley, which was named for scientist William More Gabb

Geography
- Country: United States
- State: Nevada
- District: Mineral County
- Range coordinates: 38°40′19″N 118°11′07″W
- Topo map: USGS Mount Ferguson

The Gabbs Valley Range is a mountain range in the west of the central Nevada desert in the Great Basin region. The range is within Mineral County, Nevada.

The valley was named after an engineer, E. S. Gabbs.

== Gabbs Watershed ==
The Gabbs Watershed (USGS Huc 16060002) is a 2,060 sq mi (5,300 km^{2}) area that includes the Gabbs Valley and the slopes of the perimeter Great Basin mountain ranges within the watersheds' drainage divides, e.g., of the Gabbs Valley Range.
