= Berlin Historic District (Berlin, Nevada) =

Historic district in Nevada, United States

- U.S. National Register of Historic Places
- U.S. Historic district
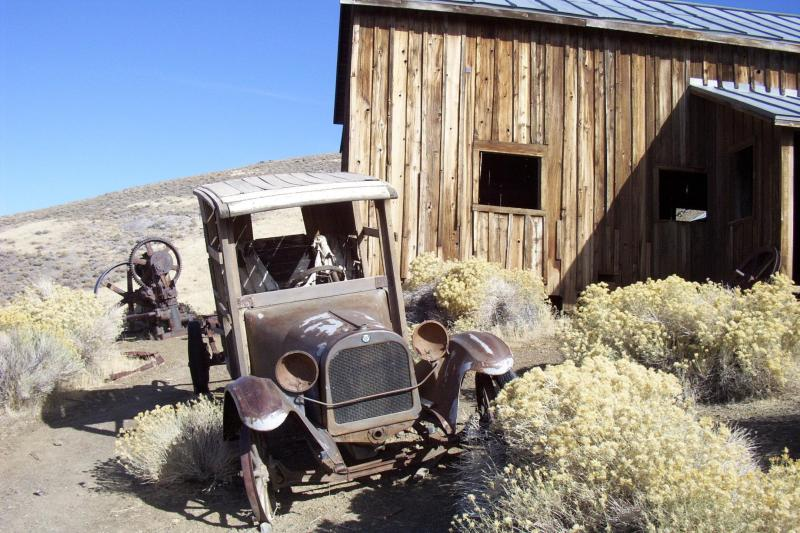

- Location within Nevada Location within the United States
- Location: Off NV 23, Berlin, Nevada
- Coordinates: 38°52′56″N 117°36′26″W
- Built: 1897
- NRHP reference No.: 71000490
- Added to NRHP: November 5, 1971

The Berlin Historic District encompasses the ghost town of Berlin in Nye County, Nevada. The town was established in 1897 as part of the Union Mining District after the opening of the Berlin Mine the previous year. The name is a transfer from Berlin, in Germany, the native land of a share of the local prospectors. The town never prospered to the same extent as other boom towns like Tonopah and Goldfield, and declined following the Panic of 1907. The town was largely abandoned by 1911. The site was acquired by the state of Nevada as part of Berlin–Ichthyosaur State Park in 1970.

The town is on the western side of the Shoshone Range on the edge of Toiyabe National Forest at an elevation of about 6,676 ft (2,035 m) above sea level. At elevations above the townsite, the forest becomes more dense and provided a source of building materials for the town. The town is arranged in a U shape, opening to the east. At its peak, the town had about 75 buildings and 300 residents. Berlin was a company town, operated by the Nevada Company and was maintained until its acquisition by the state in 1970. This accounts for the town's excellent state of preservation.

The town of Union, one mile (1.6 km) to the east, functioned as a suburb to Berlin. The Berlin Mine had three miles (4.8 km) of tunnels, but produced less than $1 million worth of gold and silver during its lifetime. The Diana mine connects to the Berlin Mine at the fourth level and is preserved as a mining museum. Tours of the Diana Mine were halted in 2007 until a safety review could be completed.

The preserved buildings in Berlin include the mine supervisor's house, now the park office, the assay office and a machine shop. The 30-stamp mill, one of the best of its type in the state, has been stabilized.

The town was added to the National Register of Historic Places in 1971.

== See also ==
- List of ghost towns in Nevada
