= Berlin–Ichthyosaur State Park =

State park in Nevada, United States

Berlin-Ichthyosaur State Park
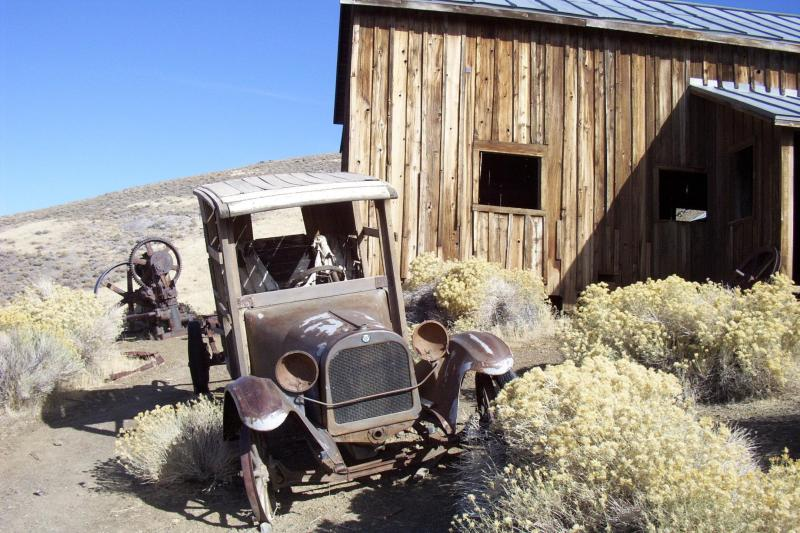
- Berlin's abandoned machine shop

- Location within Nevada
- Interactive map of Berlin-Ichthyosaur State Park
- Location: Nye County, Nevada, United States
- Nearest town: Gabbs, Nevada
- Coordinates: 38°52′29″N 117°35′23″W
- Area: 1,115.52 acres (451.43 ha)
- Elevation: 6,975 ft (2,126 m)
- Established: 1957
- Administrator: Nevada Division of State Parks
- Visitors: 2,036 vehicles (in 2017)
- Designation: Nevada state park
- Website: Official website

U.S. National Natural Landmark
- Designated: 1973

Berlin–Ichthyosaur State Park is a public recreation area and historic preserve that protects undisturbed ichthyosaur fossils and the ghost town of Berlin in far northwestern Nye County, Nevada. The state park covers more than 1,100 acres (450 ha) at an elevation of 7,000 feet (2,100 m) on the western slope of central Nevada's Shoshone mountain range, 23 miles (37 km) east of Gabbs.

== Ghost town ==
The town of Berlin sprang up in 1896, when substantial gold veins were discovered nearby. In total, the Berlin Mine produced 42,000 troy ounces (46,080 oz; 1,306.346 kg) of gold, all removed from tunnels by hard rock mining techniques. The mine became unprofitable by 1911, and the town of Berlin became uninhabited shortly thereafter.

Today, the ore mill still stands, and the stamps and mercury float tables can be viewed. Other buildings still standing include homes, blacksmith shop, stage coach shop and stable, machine shop, and assay office. Some buildings are open to enter, while others offer interior views of their contents through the windows. There are also headworks on some of the mine shafts.

== Fossils ==
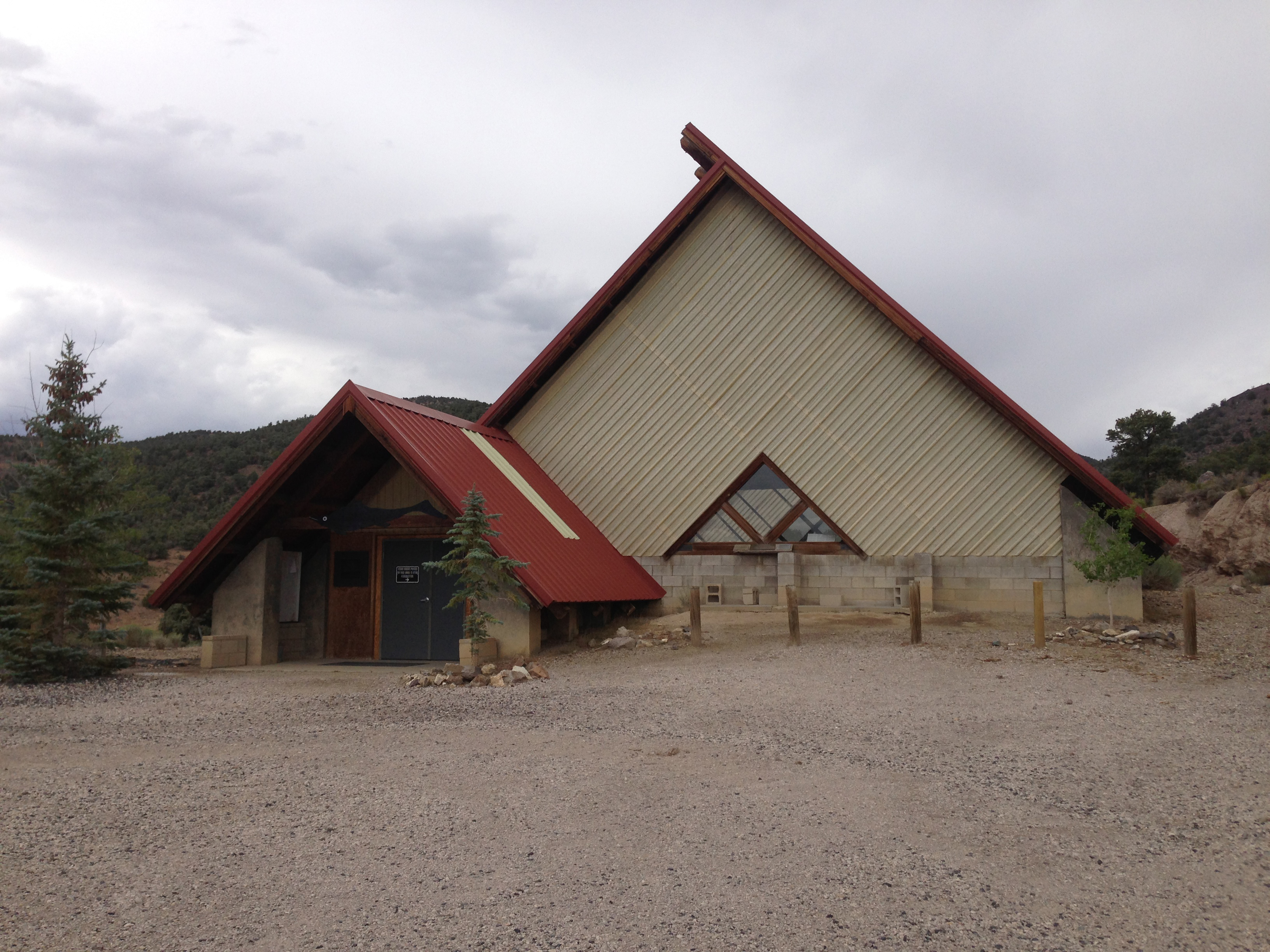
Fossil barn protecting in situ displays

Ichthyosaur fossils of the species Shonisaurus popularis were first discovered in the area in 1928. Excavations were conducted through the 1960s, and the remains of approximately 40 ichthyosaurs were found. Until 2004, these remains included the largest ichthyosaurs ever discovered. Several specimens were left where they were found, and can be viewed by the public. These specimens are protected from the elements by a large barn. The fossils are about a 10-minute drive from the Berlin ghost town. The ichthyosaur fossils were designated a National Natural Landmark in 1973.

== Activities and amenities ==
The park offers camping, picnicking, nature trail, and non–winter-month guided tours of the fossil shelter. Multiple trail signs relate the history of the town of Berlin and the mining camp of Union. Guided mine tours proceed approximately 500 feet (150 m) into a tunnel that connects with the Berlin Mine; all other access to the underground works is prohibited as too dangerous.
