= Gabbs, Nevada =

Unincorporated town in the State of Nevada, United States

- Unincorporated town
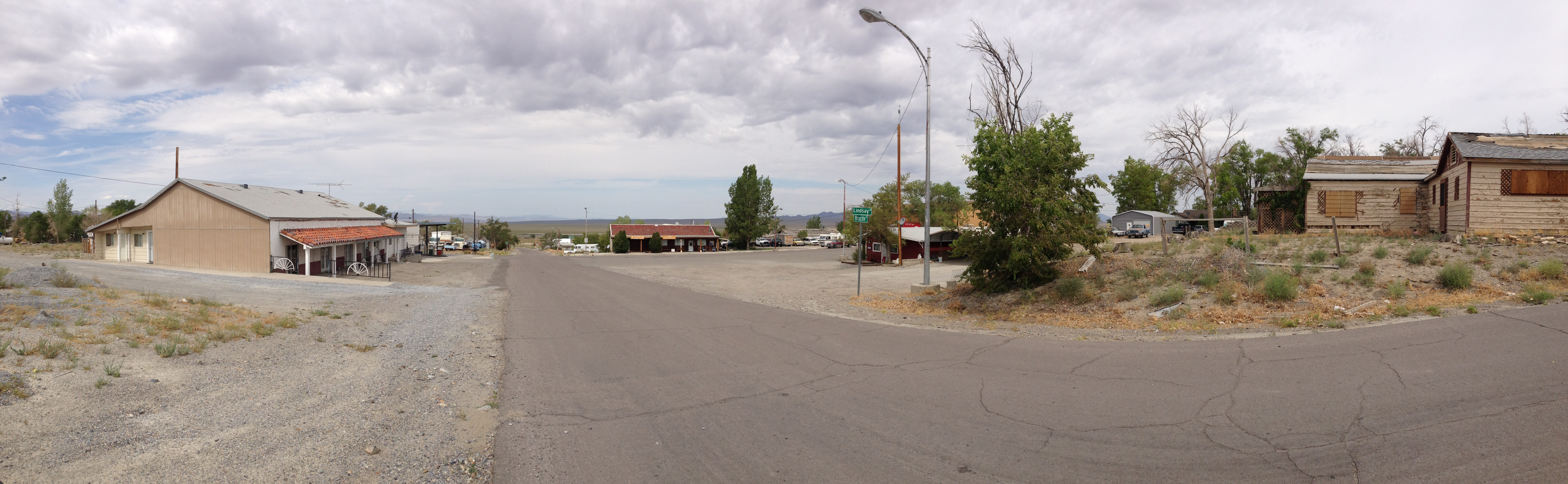
- Central Gabbs
- Nickname: The Little-Big Northwest
- Motto(s): High up we go, the town of Gabbs show
- Location of Gabbs, Nevada

- Location in the United States
- Coordinates: 38°51′59″N 117°55′32″W
- Country: United States
- State: Nevada
- County: Nye

Area
  - Total: 1.50 sq mi (3.89 km^{2})
  - Land: 1.50 sq mi (3.88 km^{2})
  - Water: 0.0039 sq mi (0.01 km^{2})

Population (2020)
  - Total: 186
  - Density: 124.2/sq mi (47.94/km^{2})
- Time zone: UTC-8 (Pacific (PST))
  - Summer (DST): UTC-7 (PDT)
- ZIP code: 89409
- Area code: 775
- FIPS code: 32-25900

Gabbs is an unincorporated town in Nye County, Nevada, United States. The population was 269 at the 2010 census. Located in northern Nye County, it is part of the Las Vegas–Henderson, NV CSA (Combined Statistical Area), making it at 321 miles (517 km) the most distant community from Las Vegas in the Las Vegas–Henderson combined statistical area.

== History ==
Gabbs was founded circa December 1941 as a company town for Basic Magnesium, Inc. (BMI), which operated a magnesium production plant in the area. The town grew out of an earlier mining camp named Brucite (after the magnesium oxide brucite that occurred locally), and took the name of the surrounding Gabbs Valley, itself named after paleontologist William Gabb (who had studied fossil specimens from the area). World War II demand for magnesium fuelled the plant's expansion under the direction of the War Production Board, and policing, a jail, and a school district were established during 1942. Gabbs became a township in June 1943, with a population of 426. Settlements at North Gabbs, South Gabbs, and Tent City (which later largely merged into North Gabbs) were served by a library, city hall, parks, and tennis courts, and a succession of local newspapers. The city incorporated on March 29, 1955.

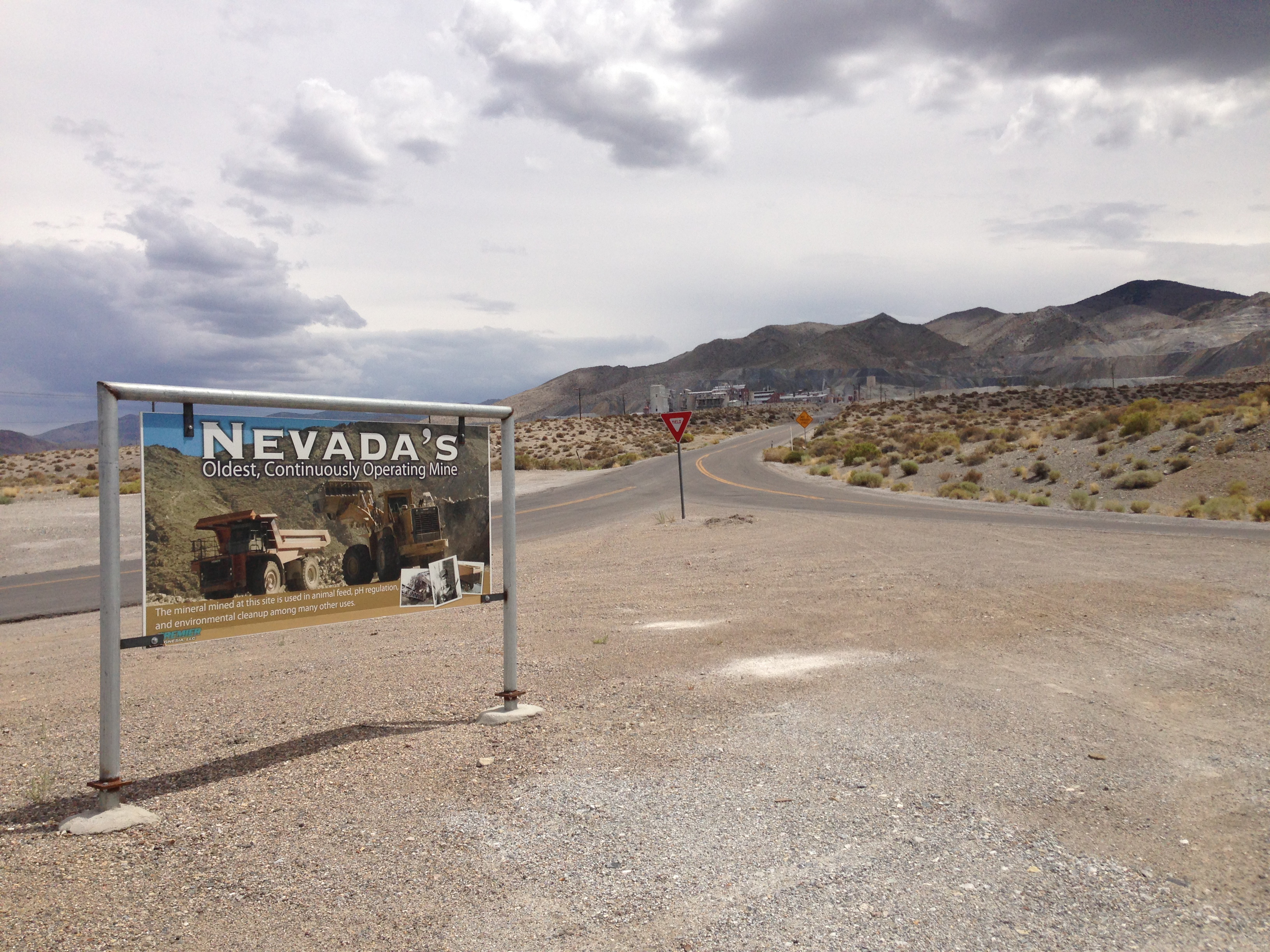
Mine entrance in Gabbs

In September 1944, the original magnesium plant was closed, having produced enough ore to meet targets for the projected duration of the war. The local population initially fell, but revived when a new plant administered by Basic Refractories, Inc., producing magnesium for the private sector, was opened in 1955. The town's population climbed to 796 by 1960.

In 1982, BRI laid off half its 350 workers, prompting the town's population to decline once more. An influx of workers to a gold mine in nearby Paradise Peak briefly expanded the population again during the 1980s and 1990s, but this plant too closed in 1994, and in 2001 Gabbs lost its incorporated status. Today the town retains a high school, stores, and homes.

== Geography ==
Gabbs is located at 38°51′59″N 117°55′32″W (38.866469, -117.925512).

According to the United States Census Bureau, the CDP has a total area of 2.2 square miles (5.8 km^{2}), all land.

== Demographics ==
Historical population
| Census | Pop. | Note | %± |
|---|---|---|---|
| 1960 | 770 | | — |
| 1970 | 874 | | 13.5% |
| 1980 | 811 | | −7.2% |
| 1990 | 667 | | −17.8% |
| 2000 | 318 | | −52.3% |
| 2010 | 269 | | −15.4% |
| 2020 | 186 | | −30.9% |
U.S. Decennial Census

As of the census of 2010, there were 269 people, 121 households, and 78 families residing in the census-designated place (CDP) of Gabbs. The population density was 122.3 inhabitants per square mile (47.2/km^{2}). There were 183 housing units at an average density of 83.2 per square mile (32.1/km^{2}). The racial makeup of the CDP was 87.4% White, 5.6% Native American, 1.1% Asian, 0.7% some other race, and 5.2% from two or more races. Hispanic or Latino of any race were 4.5% of the population.

There were 121 households, out of which 23.1% had children under the age of 18 living with them, 51.2% were headed by married couples living together, 8.3% had a female householder with no husband present, and 35.5% were non-families. 32.2% of all households were made up of individuals, and 12.4% were someone living alone who was 65 years of age or older. The average household size was 2.22, and the average family size was 2.78.

In the CDP the population was spread out, with 20.8% under the age of 18, 4.3% from 18 to 24, 17.0% from 25 to 44, 36.8% from 45 to 64, and 20.8% who were 65 years of age or older. The median age was 50.1 years. For every 100 females, there were 116.9 males. For every 100 females age 18 and over, there were 115.2 males.

For the period 2007–2011, the estimated median annual income for a household in the CDP was $26,250, and the median income for a family was $26,346. The per capita income for the CDP was $20,630. About 28.1% of families and 21.8% of the population were below the poverty line.
