= Timeline of ichthyosaur research =

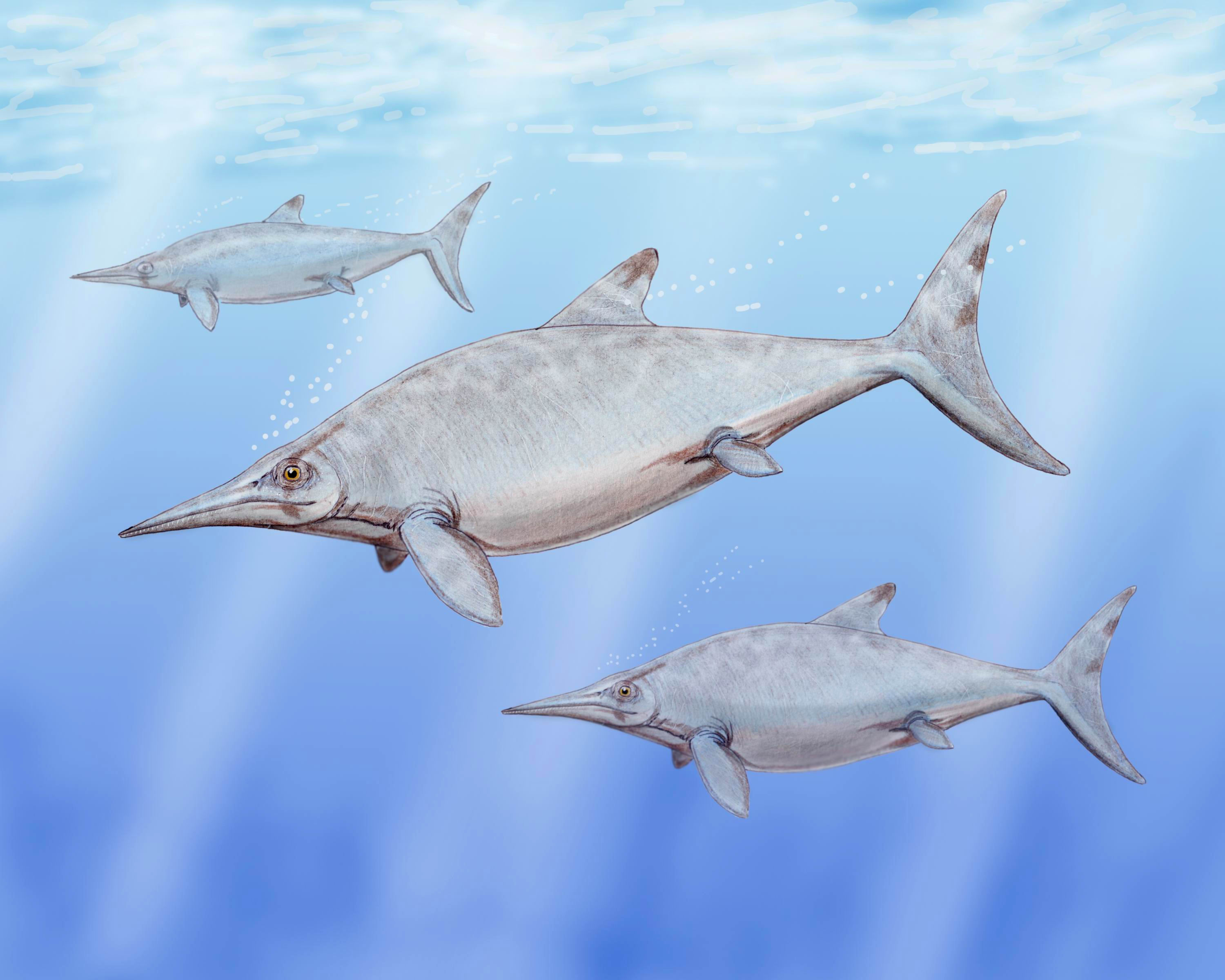
Artist's restoration of a school of Grendelius

This timeline of ichthyosaur research is a chronological listing of events in the history of paleontology focused on the ichthyosauromorphs, a group of secondarily aquatic marine reptiles whose later members superficially resembled dolphins, sharks, or swordfish. Scientists have documented ichthyosaur fossils at least as far back as the late 17th century. At that time, a scholar named Edward Lhuyd published a book on British fossils that misattributed some ichthyosaur vertebrae to actual fishes; their true nature was not recognized until the 19th century. In 1811, a boy named Joseph Anning discovered the first ichthyosaur fossils that would come to be scientifically recognized as such. His sister, Mary Anning, would later find the rest of its skeleton and would go on to become a respected fossil collector and paleontologist in her own right.

Early researchers recognized ichthyosaurs as marine reptiles, but major aspects of their anatomy and behavior needed to be resolved. They were frequently portrayed as leaving the water to bask on rocks and with straight tails. Although a bend in ichthyosaurs' tail vertebrae was seen from the earliest specimens, scholars assumed the bend reflected damage incurred to the animal's carcass after death. This bend was so common, however, that scholars eventually realized that it was natural and supported a shark-like tail fin. Scientists came to realize that ichthyosaurs were too adapted to leave the water even to lay eggs. Evidence for live birth in ichthyosaurs dates back as far as 1846, when Chaning Pierce reported an apparent fossil Ichthyosaurus embryo to Sir Richard Owen.

Ichthyosaur discoveries continued to be made into the 20th century. In 1928, Simeon Muller discovered the remains of 40 gigantic ichthyosaurs in Nevada. However, these remains would not be excavated until Charles Camp and Samuel Welles of Berkeley led an expedition for the purpose in the mid 1950s. These fossils would take more than a decade to excavate, and the results of Camp's examination of the bones would not be published until a year after his 1975 death. These giant ichthyosaurs were named Shonisaurus popularis and their final resting place is now known as Berlin-Ichthyosaur state park.

Other notable late 20th century advances in ichthyosaur research include the recognition of a new genus of ichthyosaur called Eurhinosaurus longirostris that had been misclassified as a species of Ichthyosaurus since 1854. In 1986 Christopher McGowan would describe another, similar animal serendipitously discovered in England as Excalibosaurus, after King Arthur's mythical sword. The late 1990s and early 21st century would see scholarly debate regarding the cause of the ichthyosaurs' extinction, especially regarding the potential role played by competition with the mosasaurs which had evolved around the time.

== 17th century ==
=== 1699 ===
- Edward Lhuyd published a book called Lithophylacii Britannici Ichonographia about British fossils housed in Oxford's Ashmolean Museum. The book contained illustrations of unrecognized ichthyosaur vertebrae misidentified as belonging to fishes. 120 copies of the book were produced.

== 19th century ==
=== 1810s ===
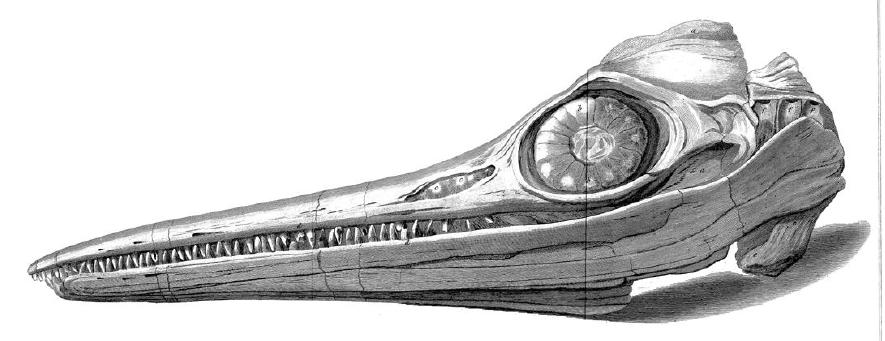
Illustration of the ichthyosaur skull discovered by Joseph Anning. Everard Home, 1814

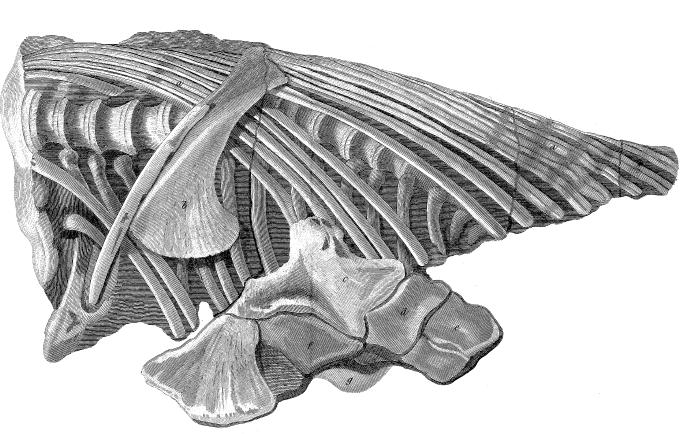
The torso found by Mary Anning

==== 1811 ====
- Joseph Anning discovered the first scientifically recognized ichthyosaur remains.

==== 1812 ====
- Mary Anning found the rest of the original ichthyosaur skeleton discovered by her brother Joseph.

==== 1814 ====
- An anatomist with the Royal College of Surgeons named Sir Everard Home described the ichthyosaur discovered by the Annings. He thought it formed a "link between fishes and crocodiles".

==== 1818 ====
- König described the new genus Ichthyosaurus.

==== 1819 ====
- Everard Home changed his mind about the relationships of Ichthyosaurus. Instead of linking fishes with crocodiles, he concluded that it linked salamanders and lizards. He tried to rename it Proteosaurus after the salamander genus Proteus, but his original name had priority and is still considered official.

=== 1820s ===
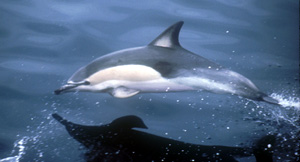
Ichthyosaurs have long been compared to dolphins.

==== 1822 ====
- Conybeare described Ichthyosaurus communis and I. intermedius along with the species that would later come to be known as Leptonectes tenuirostris and Temnodontosaurus platyodon.

==== 1823 ====
- Mary Anning or a member of her family discovered a complete Ichthyosaurus skeleton in Lyme Regis. The find aroused widespread curiosity about ancient life throughout Britain.

==== 1824 ====
- The Reverend George Young discovered an ichthyosaur fossil in Whitby, Yorkshire. He also described the specimen, noting that it shared traits with crocodiles, fishes, and dolphins. Young speculated that ichthyosaurs might still be discovered alive as more of the world's seas and oceans are explored.

=== 1830s ===
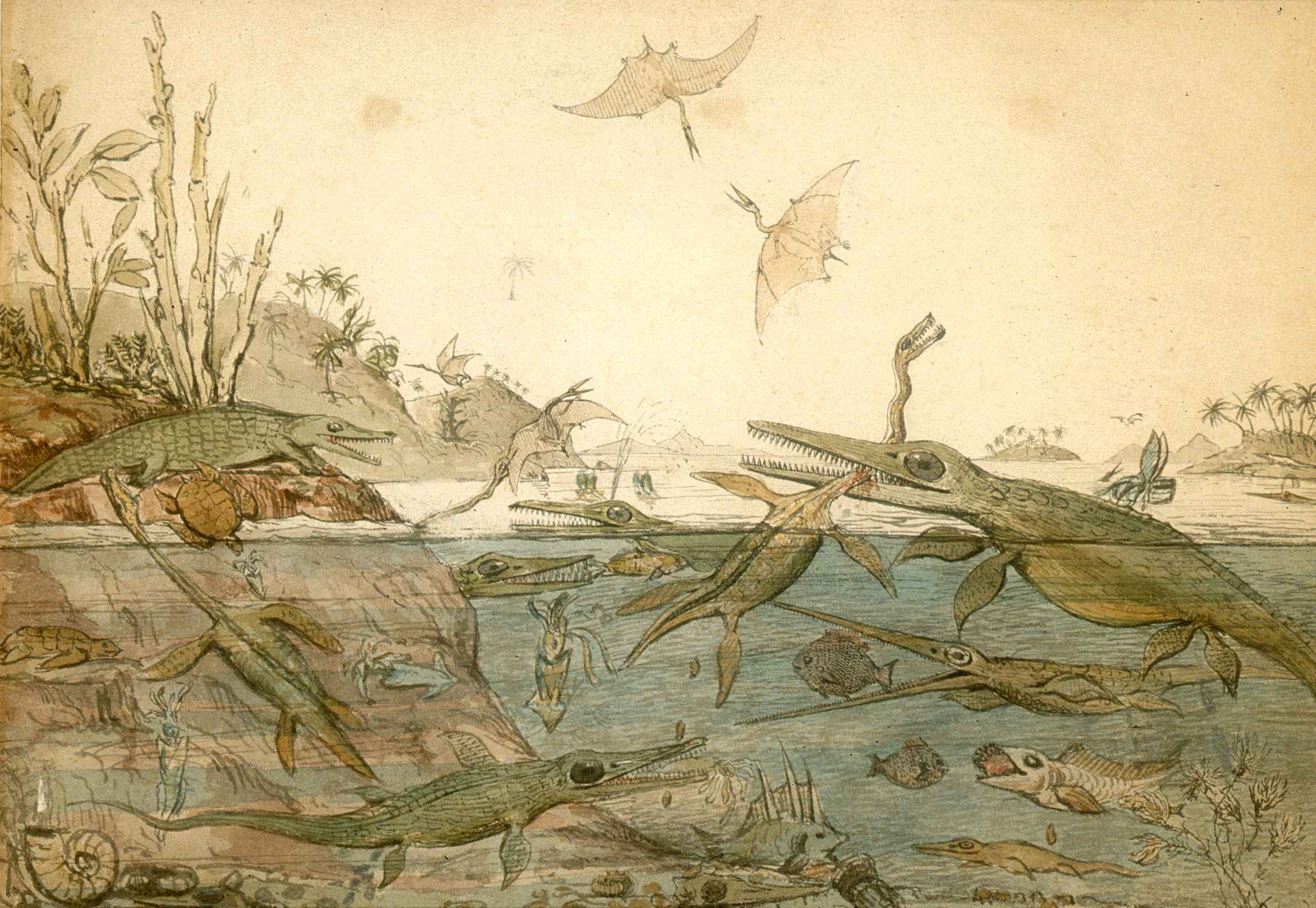
Duria Antiquior, by Henry de la Beche, 1830

==== 1830 ====
- Henry de la Beche illustrated a work titled "Duria Antiquior", meaning "Ancient Dorset" for fossil hunter Mary Anning. This work, which prominently features plesiosaurs, has been regarded as the first attempt to accurately reconstruct the Mesozoic world through an artistic medium.

==== 1834 ====
- Thomas W. Hawkins published a book titled Memoirs of Ichthyosauri and Plesiosauri. He sold it in subscription format for L2.10, an exorbitantly high price for the period. The book included illustrations by landscape painter John Samuelson Templeton, although many of these inaccurately portray ichthyosaurs with straight tails and leaving the water to bask on rocks.

=== 1840s ===
==== 1840 ====
- Owen described the new species "Ichthyosaurus" acutirostris.

==== 1843 ====
- Theodori described the new species that would later become known as Temnodontosaurus trigonodon.

==== 1844 ====
- Bronn described the species that would later become known as Suevoleviathan integer.

==== 1846 ====
- Chaning Pearce discovered that a specimen of Ichthyosaurus communis contained the skeleton of another, tiny I. communis partially protruding from the larger individual's pelvis. After discussing the fossil with Sir Richard Owen, Pearce concluded that the specimen was a female killed and preserved in the act of giving birth.

=== 1850s ===
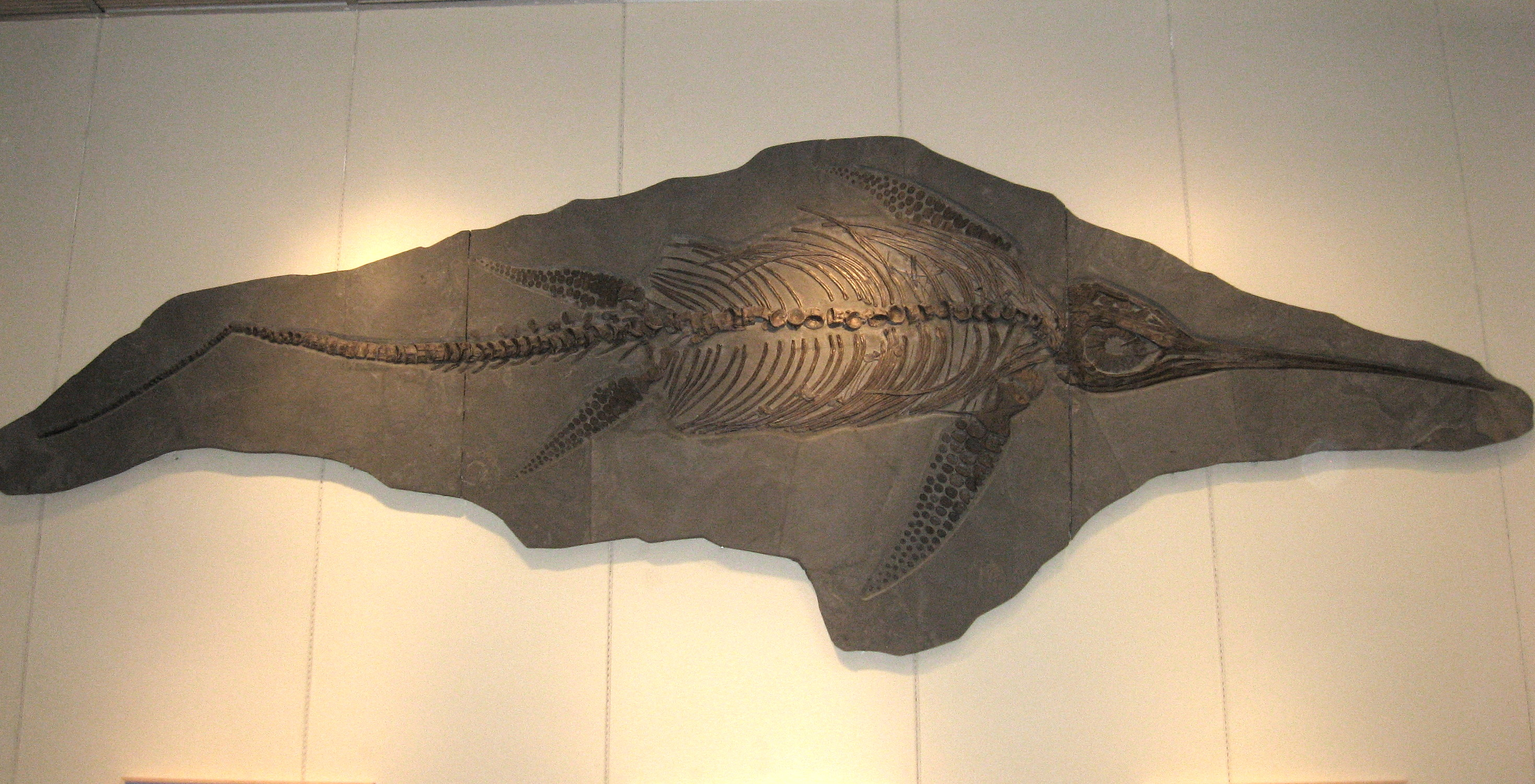
Fossil of Ichthyosaurus (now Eurhinosaurus) longirostris

==== 1851 ====
- Gideon Mantell described the new species Ichthyosaurus longirostris based on fossil found in Whitby, Yorkshire. Its upper jaw was so much longer than its lower jaw that it resembled a swordfish.
- Meyer described the new genus and species Tholodus schmidi.

==== 1852 ====
- Quenstedt described the species that would later become known as Contectopalatus atavus.

==== 1853 ====
- Henry Coles reported that ichthyosaurs were covered by scales resembling tiny hairs or spines. However, these supposed scales were actually hooklets from the tentacles of the prehistoric cephalopods the ichthyosaur had eaten.
- Wagner described the species that would one day be known as Aegirosaurus leptospondylus.

==== 1854 ====
- Sir Richard Owen inaccurately reconstructed Ichthyosaurus as straight-tailed and able to bask on rocks for an outdoor exhibit at Sydenham.

==== 1858 ====
- Quenstedt described the species that would later come to be known as Stenopterygius quadriscissus and Stenopterygius triscissus.

=== 1860s ===
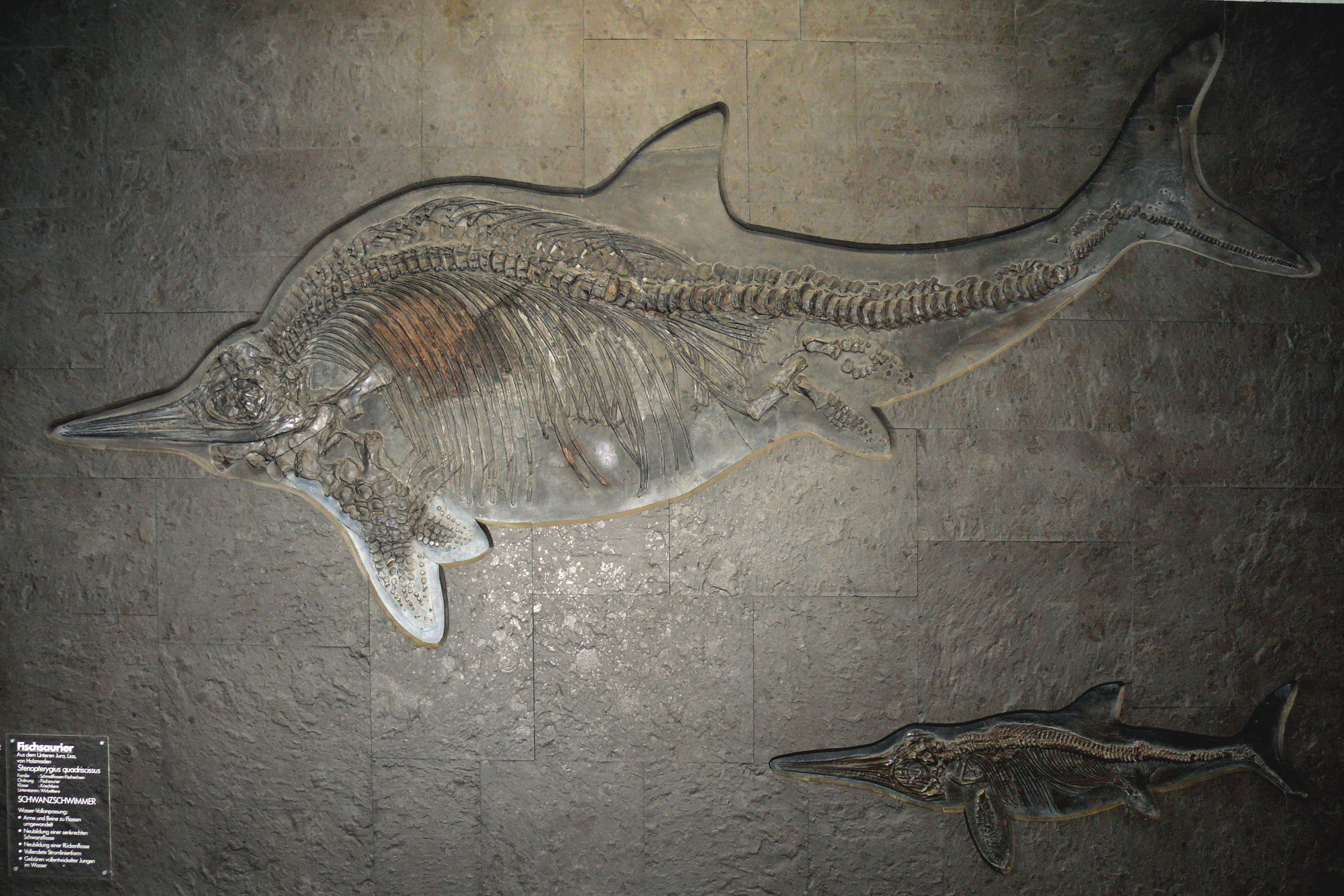
Two fossil Stenopterygius from Holzmaden

==== 1860 ====
- Sir Richard Owen tried to rename the Ichthyosauria the Ichthyopterygia.
- The first ichthyosaur fossils known from Australia were discovered in Queensland and named Ichthyosaurus australis.

==== 1866 ====
- Oskar Fraas of Stuttgart's Museum of Natural History documented the bustling ichthyosaur excavations at Holzmaden.

==== 1867 ====
- M'Coy described the species that would later come to be known as Platypterygius australis .

==== 1868 ====
- Leidy described the genus Cymbospondylus and the species Cymbospondylus piscosus and Cymbospondylus petrinus .

=== 1870s ===
==== 1871 ====
- Hulke described the species that would later become known as Nannopterygius enthekiodon.

==== 1874 ====
- Seeley described the new genus and species Ophthalmosaurus icenicus.

==== 1876 ====
- Blake described the species that would one day come to be known as Temnodontosaurus crassimanus.

==== 1879 ====
- Marsh described the species that would one day come to be known as Ophthalmosaurus natans.

=== 1880s ===
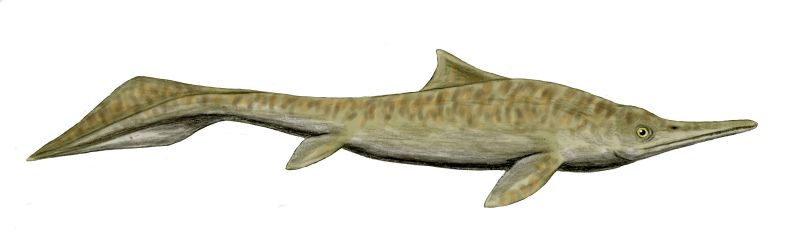
Artist's restoration of Mixosaurus

==== 1880 ====
- Harry Govier Seeley published an argument in favor of live birth in ichthyosaurs. Seeley noted that many ichthyosaur specimens from Britain and Germany contained miniature ichthyosaur skeletons inside them. While some researchers interpreted these remains as fossil stomach contents, Seeley observed that the smaller skeletons tend to be located too near the rear of the animal to be stomach contents. Instead, he interpreted the small skeletons as fetuses and the larger ones as pregnant females.

==== 1881 ====
- Owen described the species Ichthyosaurus breviceps .

==== 1886 ====
- Bassani described the species that would later come to be known as Mixosaurus cornalianus.

==== 1887 ====
- Georg Baur published a paper speculating on the origins of ichthyosaurs. He concluded that ichthyosaurs were descended from relatives of the Sphenodontidae, the family that includes the modern tuatara. He reclassified the species Ichthyosaurus cornalianus and I. atavus into a new genus, Mixosaurus. He also erected a new family for this genus, the Mixosauridae.

==== 1888 ====
- Lydekker described the species Ichthyosaurus conybeari and the species that would later come to be known as Brachypterygius cantabridgiensis.

==== 1889 ====
- Lydekker described the genus Temnodontosaurus.

=== 1890s ===
==== 1895 ====
- Merriam described the new genus and species Shastasaurus pacificus.

== 20th century ==
=== 1900s ===
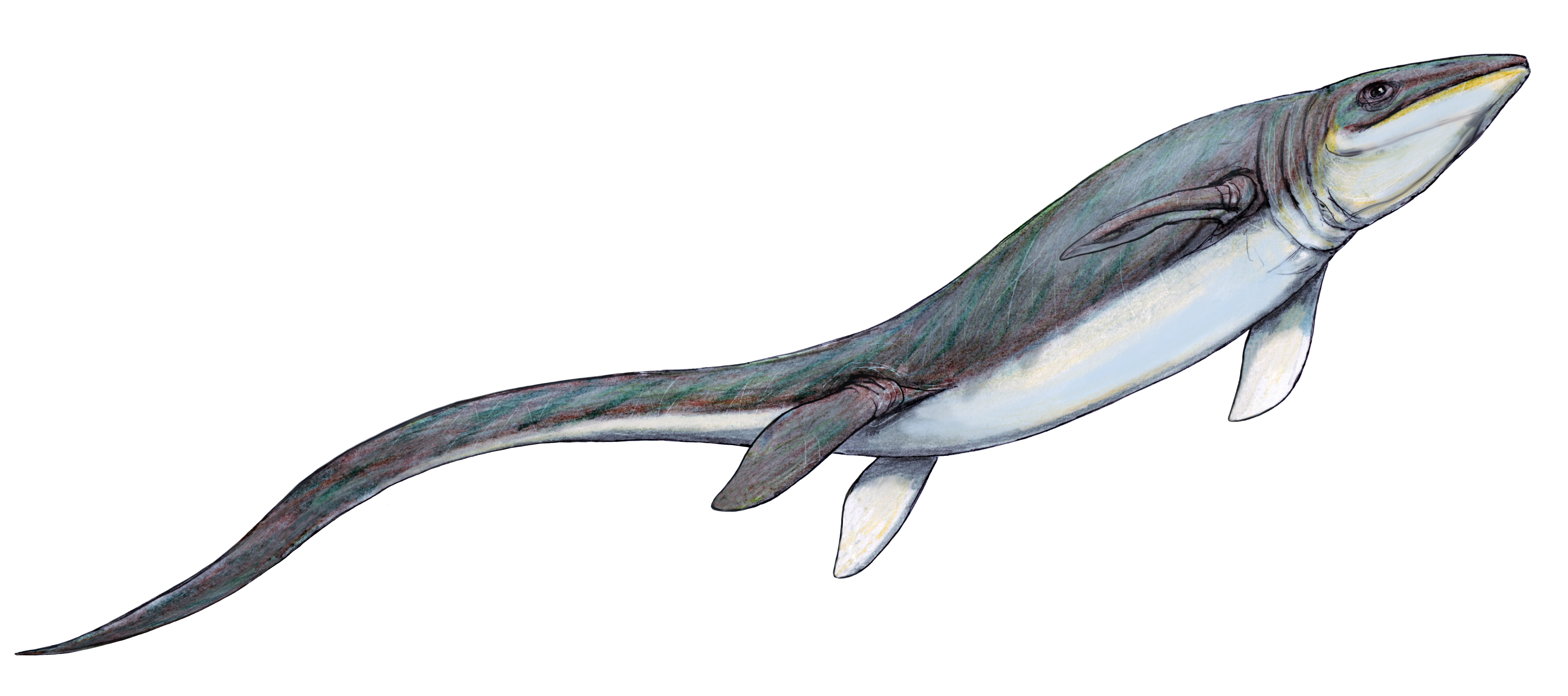
Artist's restoration of Omphalosaurus

==== 1902 ====
- J. C. Merriam named the new species Shastasaurus alexandrae after Annie Alexander, the wealthy fossil enthusiast who financed much of his research and founded the Museum of Paleontology at Berkeley. He also described the species that would later come to be known as Californosaurus perrini.

==== 1903 ====
- J. C. Merriam described the new genus Toretocnemus from Late Triassic rocks in California. Along with the genus, he described the species Toretocnemus californicus and Toretocnemus zitteli.

==== 1904 ====
- Boulenger described the species that would later become known as Brachypterygius extremus.
- Jaekel described the new genus Stenopterygius.

==== 1906 ====
- J. C. Merriam discovered the unusual remains of an animal with short jaws and button-shaped teeth in Nevada. He thought it was the first member of a new group of reptiles related to placodonts or rhynchosaurs but it would actually come to be recognized as ichthyosaurian and described as the genus Omphalosaurus.

==== 1908 ====
- Broili described the species that would later come to be known as Platypterygius platydactylus.

==== 1909 ====
- Abel erected the genus Eurhinosaurus for the species Ichthyosaurus longirostris.

=== 1910s ===
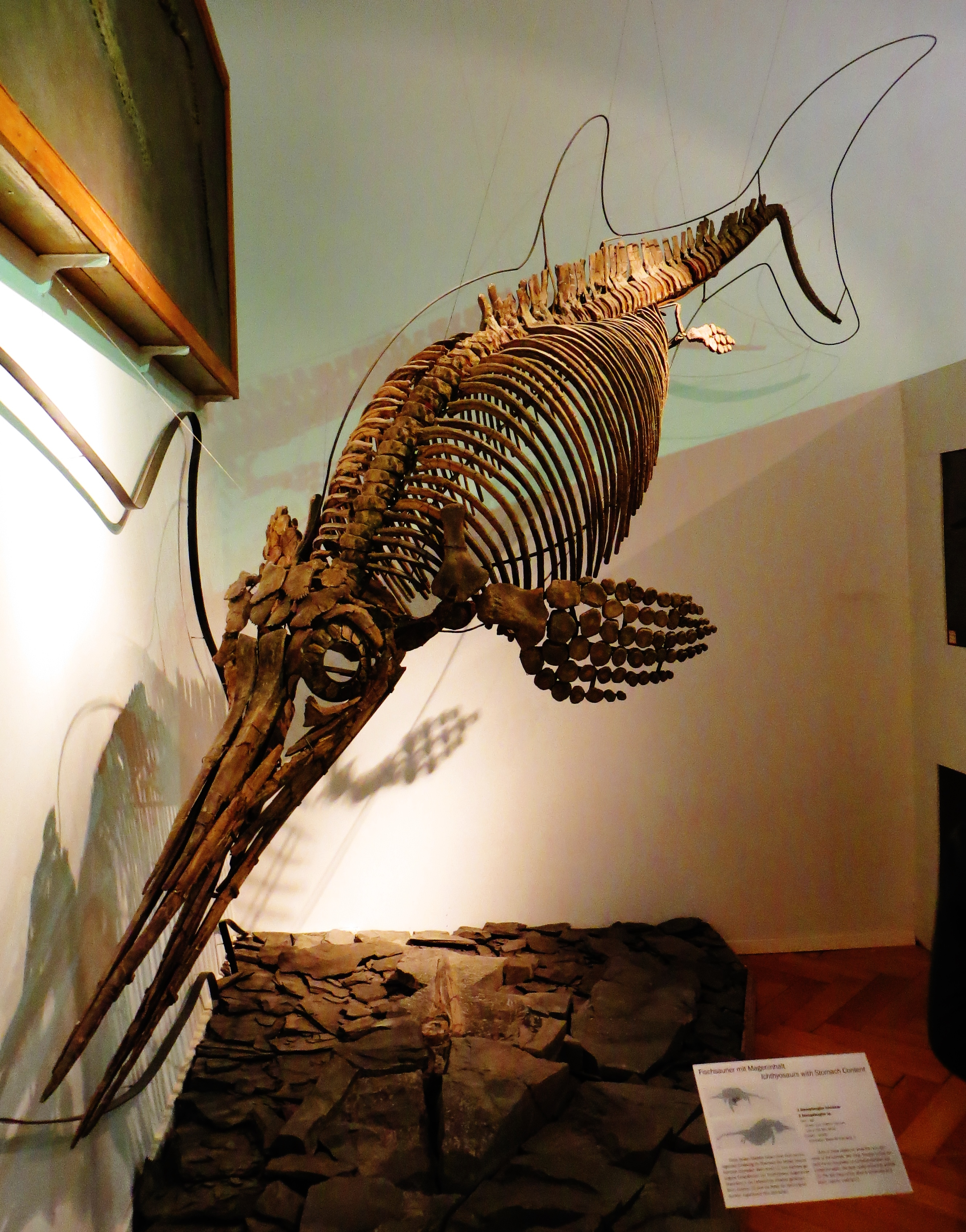
Mounted skeleton of Ophthalmosaurus

==== 1910 ====
- Some putative ichthyosaur limb bones were found in Spitsbergen. Carl Wiman would later refer these remains to the species Omphalosaurus nevadanus. Wiman also described the new genus and species Pessopteryx nisseri as well as the species that would one day be known as Isfjordosaurus minor.
- Andrews speculated that since many specimens of Ophthalmosaurus are toothless that it may have fed via suction feeding on soft foods like squid.
- Merriam described the new genus and species Phalarodon fraasi.

==== 1916 ====
- Huene described the species now known as Phalarodon major.
- Huene described the new genus and species Pachygonosaurus robustus.

=== 1920s ===
==== 1922 ====
- German paleontologist Friedrich von Huene described the new genus Brachypterygius. He also described the genera Nannopterygius and Platypterygius.

==== 1925 ====
- von Huene described a new species of Shastasaurus.

==== 1926 ====
- von Huene erected the new genus Suevoleviathan for the species "Leptopterygius" disinteger.

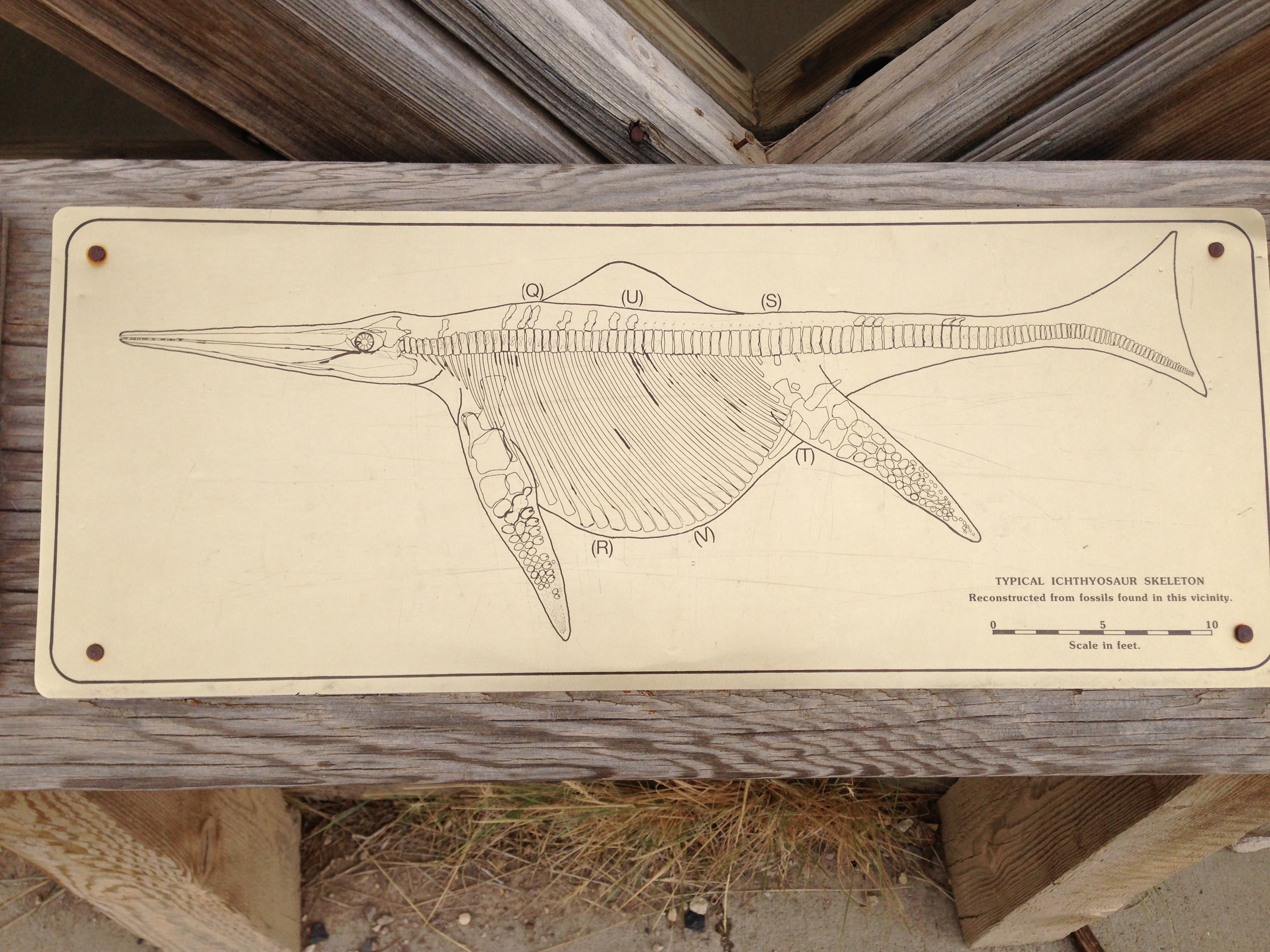
Skeletal reconstruction of the Berlin-Ichthyosaur State Park ichthyosaur

==== 1927 ====
- Huene described the species that would later come to be known as Platypterygius hauthali.

==== 1928 ====
- Simeon Muller discovered the remains of 40 gigantic ichthyosaurs in Nevada.

==== 1929 ====
- Wiman described the new genus and species Grippia longirostris.

=== 1930s ===
==== 1931 ====
- Huene described the new species Stenopterygius uniter as well as the species that would later become known as Temnodontosaurus nuertingensis .

==== 1934 ====
- The most complete known ichthyosaur specimen from Australia, a Platypterygius was discovered in Queensland. Despite not being fully grown it was 18 feet in length.
- Kuhn described the genus Californosaurus.

==== 1939 ====
- Nace described the genus that would one day be known as Platypterygius americanus.

=== 1940s ===
==== 1946 ====
- Kuhn described the species Platypterygius hercynicus.

==== 1948 ====
- Alfred Romer noted that Jurassic ichthyosaurs were so highly specialized for aquatic life that their anatomy exhibited no sign of descent from any known terrestrial reptile group.

=== 1950s ===
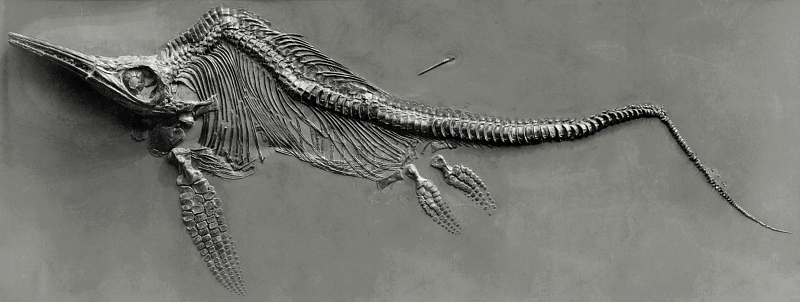
A Stenopterygius skeleton from Holzmaden

==== 1951 ====
- Willy Ley, a German zoologist, observed that more than two hundred ichthyosaur specimens were being recovered from Holzmaden annually.

==== 1954 ====
- Charles Camp and Samuel Welles of Berkeley lead the excavation of the gigantic ichthyosaur fossils discovered by Simeon Muller in the 20s. They estimated their body length to be 50 feet, which is roughly as large as a modern humpback whale.

==== 1956 ====
- Whitear reported brown pigmentation preserved in an ichthyosaur fossil.

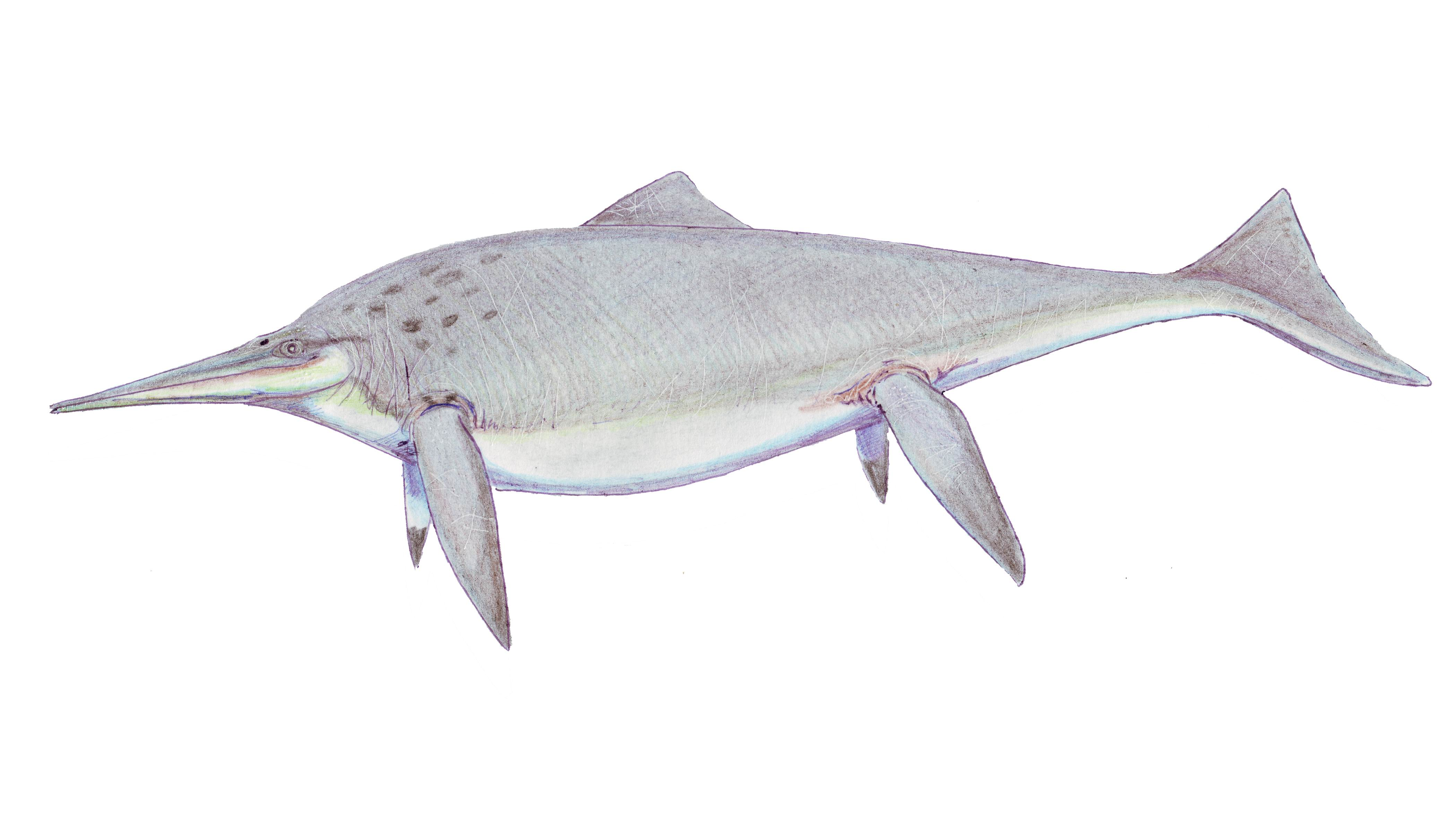
Artist's restoration of Shonisaurus

==== 1957 ====
- Camp's ichthyosaur excavation in Nevada ceased.
- Not far from Stowbridge in Norfolk, workers serendipitously discovered a large partial ichthyosaur skeleton while digging a drainage channel. The specimen was later thought to belong to the genus Ophthalmosaurus.

=== 1960s ===
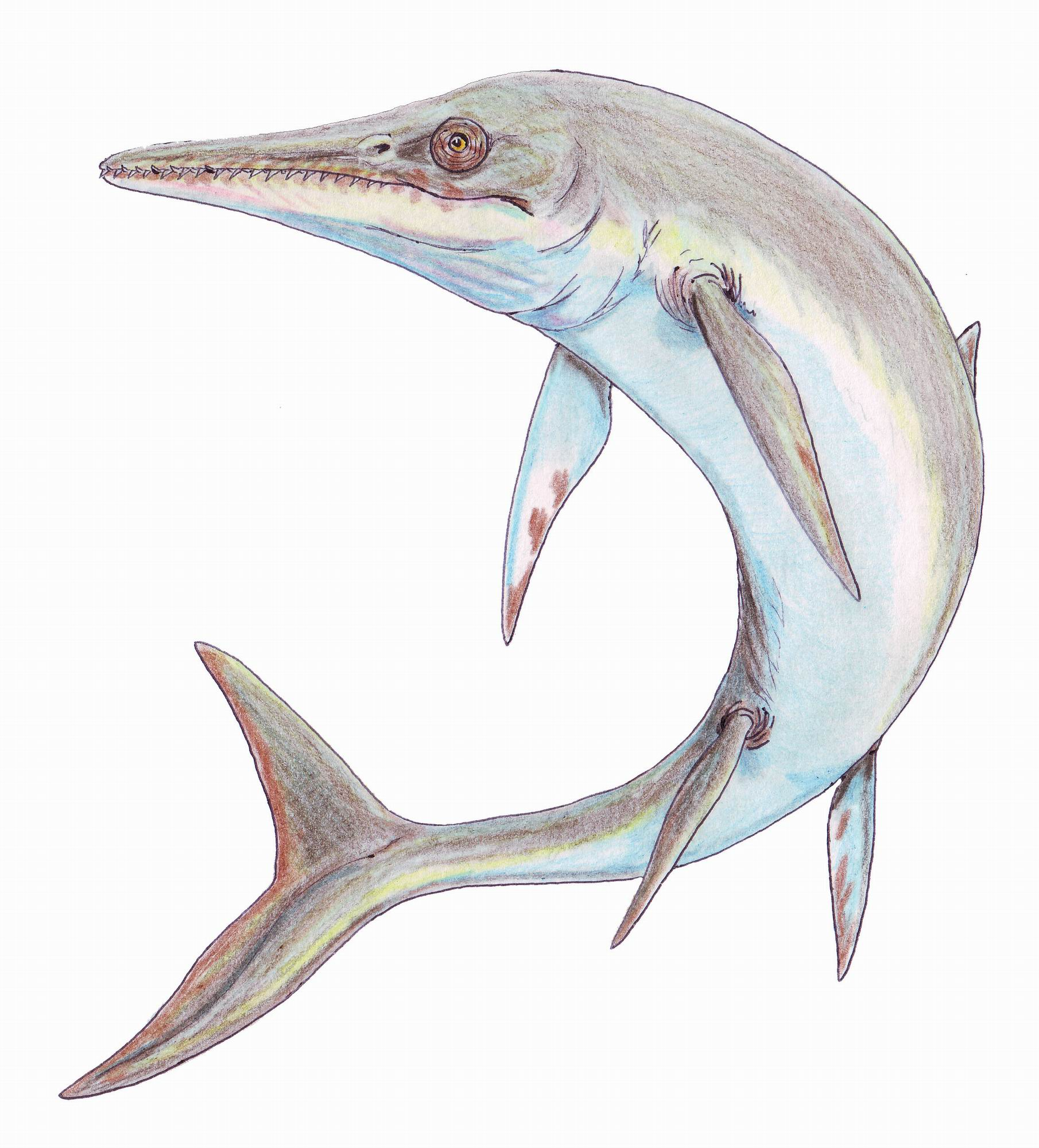
Artist's restoration of Temnodontosaurus

==== 1963 ====
- Camp resumed excavating the gigantic ichthyosaurs in Nevada.

==== 1965 ====
- Colbert hypothesized that ichthyosaurs were descended from cotylosaurs.
- Camp's ichthyosaur excavation in Nevada ended, with 35–40 partial ichthyosaur skeletons unearthed.

==== 1968 ====
- Pollard reported that Temnodontosaurus ate cephalopods.

=== 1970s ===
==== 1972 ====
- McGowan argued that the narrow-finned longipinnate and the broad-finned latipinnate ichthyosaurs could be distinguished based on features of their skulls.
- Young and Dong described the new genera and species Chaohusaurus geishanensis and Himalayasaurus tibetensis.

==== 1973 ====
- McGowan described the cranial anatomy of Ichthyosaurus. He observed that it had a very large brain for a reptile. He interpreted the animal's large cerebellum as suggestive of highly coordinated bodily movements. He also noted that its large corpus striatum implied that it had a sophisticated repertoire of instinctive behaviors. He speculated that social and parental behavior may have been among them. By contrast, the lagena of Ichthyosaurus was small, suggesting that ichthyosaurs had weak sense of hearing.

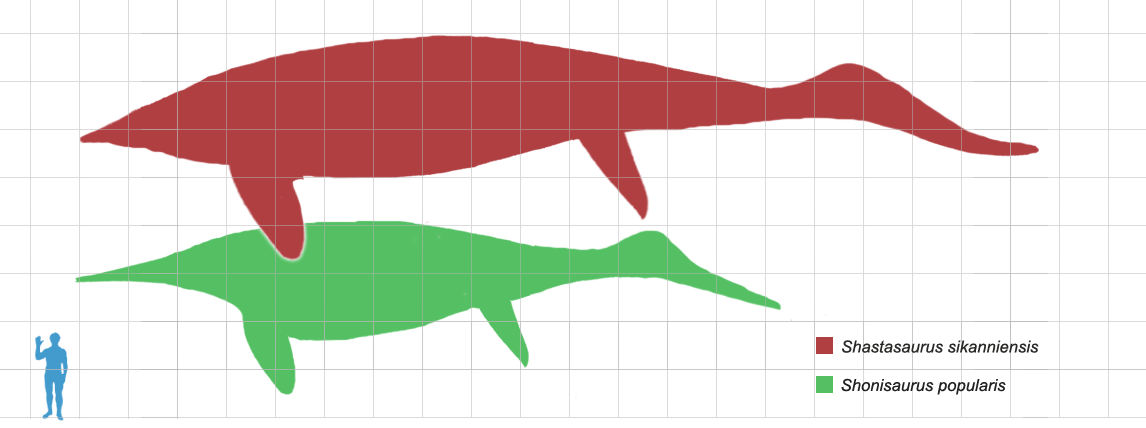
Shonisaurus popularis (green) with a human and S. sikanniensis to scale

==== 1974 ====
- McGowan described the species that would later come to be known as Temnodontosaurus eurycephalus.

==== 1975 ====
- Charles Camp died before he could finish his monograph on the Berlin-Ichthyosaur State Park ichthyosaurs.

==== 1976 ====
- Joseph Gregory, a friend of Charles Camp, published some of Camp's research on the ichthyosaurs of Berlin-Ichthyosaur State Park.
- The new genus and species Shonisaurus popularis was described.
- McGowan observed that the eyes of the supposed Ophthalmosaurus discovered in Norfolk during 1950s were too small for the animal to be referred to that genus and reclassified it in a new one: Grendelius. He also described the species that would later come to be known as Brachypterygius mordax.

==== 1978 ====
- Shikama, Kamei and Murata described the new genus and species Utatsusaurus hataii.

==== 1979 ====
- McGowan observed that more ichthyosaur remains have been found in the Early Jurassic strata of southern Germany than anywhere else in the world. He also speculated that in life most ichthyosaurs' biogeographic ranges would be as wide as those of modern whales and dolphins. McGowan attributed the narrow ranges of most known ichthyosaur species to an artifact of the fossil record, since paleontologists can only recover fossils from accessible exposures of sedimentary rocks formed in settings conducive to fossilization, which may not correspond to the complete life range of a given species. He also rejected his own previous conclusion that latipinnate and longipinnate ichthyosaurs could be distinguished based on features of the skull and expressed doubt about the validity of the latipinnate-longipinnate dichotomy altogether.

=== 1980s ===
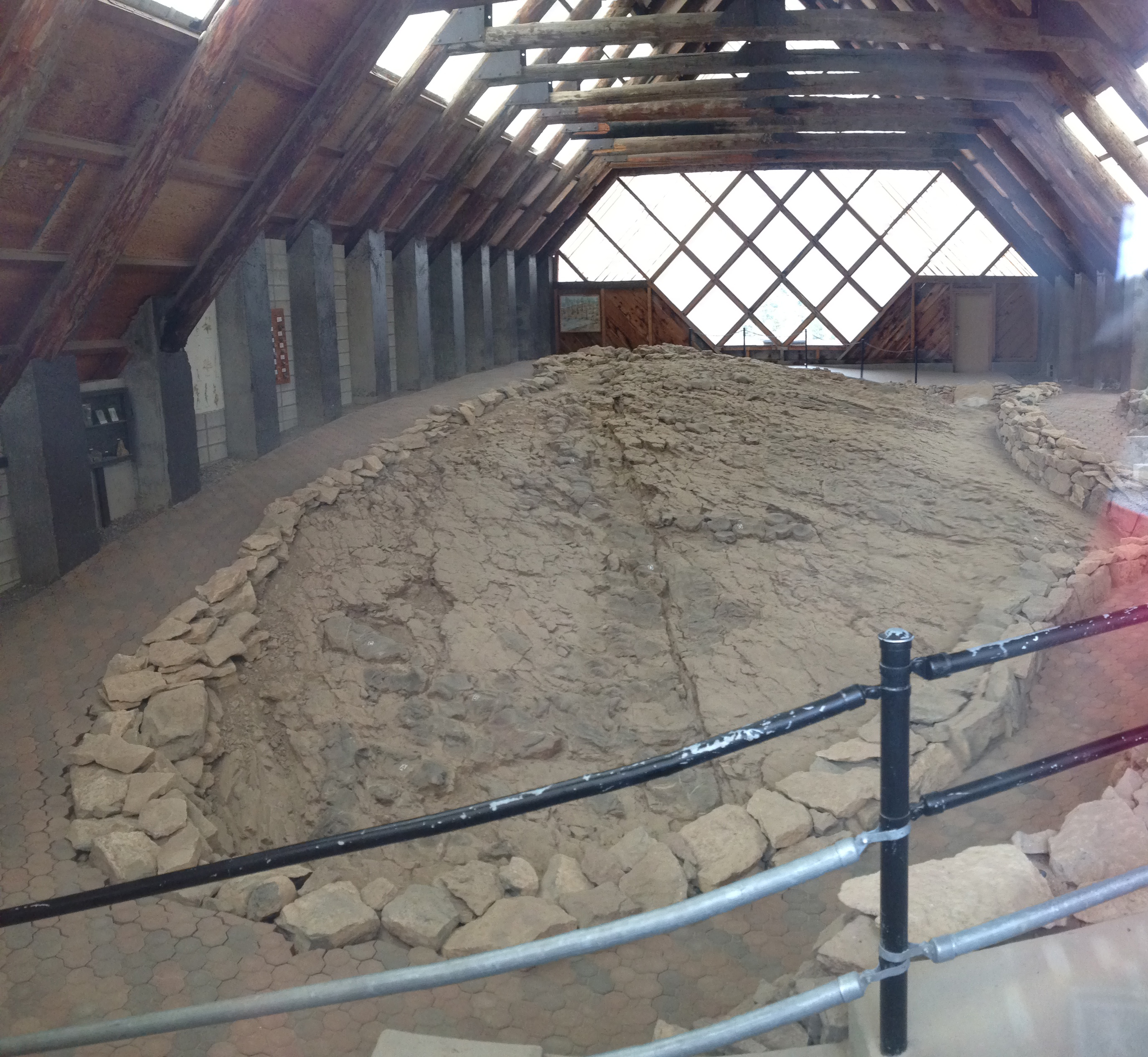
Shonisaurus fossils on exhibit at Berlin-Ichthyosaur State Park

==== 1980 ====
- Joseph Gregory published the rest of his late friend Charles Camp's research on the ichthyosaurs of Berlin-Ichthyosaur State Park. This publication contained a reconstruction of Shonisaurus portraying as a long-skulled long-finned animal with an unusually deep "pot belly".

==== 1983 ====
- Angela Kirton reported the presence of teeth in skulls attributable to Ophthalmosaurus from England. The toothlessness of many adult skulls suggest that either Ophthalmosaurus lost its teeth as it aged or the teeth were only loosely attached and prone to falling out after death.

==== 1984 ====
- Wade observed that the longest digit in the flipper of Platypterygius was made up of a series of 30 bones.
- Fossils of an unusual ichthyosaur whose upper jaw was much longer than its lower jaw were found.

==== 1985 ====
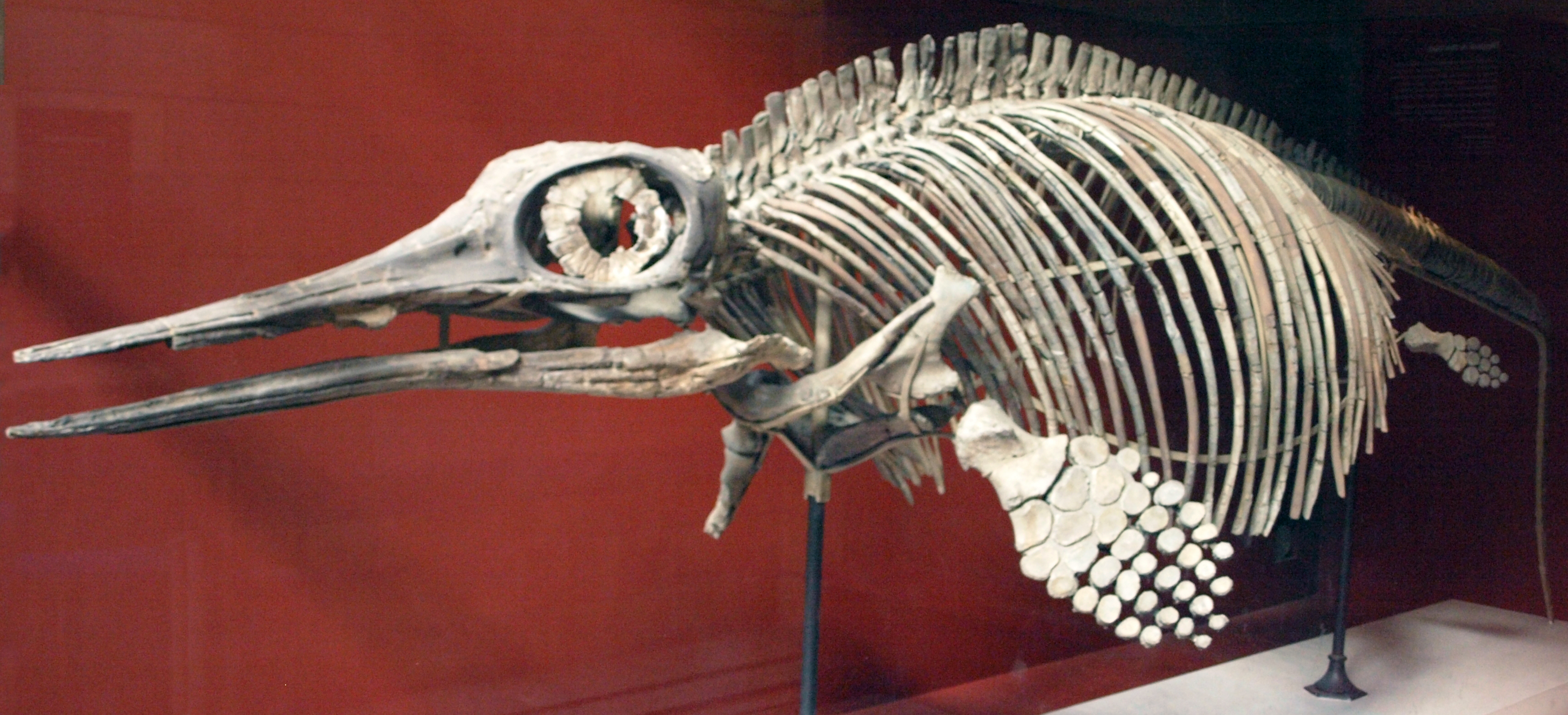
Skeletal mount of Ophthalmosaurus

- An adult Ichthyosaurus communis specimen was found with a tiny associated embryo of the same species in Kilve, Somerset.
- A man named Bernd Neubig discovered an ichthyosaur skeleton during construction of a railroad in Karlstadt, Germany. The specimen was the most complete ichthyosaur discovered in that region of the country.
- Gasparini reported the first scientifically documented ichthyosaur remains from Argentina. He referred the Argentine ichthyosaur to the genus Ophthalmosaurus.
- Otschev and Efimov described the new species Platypterygius birjukovi.

==== 1986 ====
- Christopher McGowan began leading a series of expeditions to Williston Lake, British Columbia, culminating in the discovery of the most complete known skeleton of Shastasaurus, which also served as the type specimen of a new species that would later be described in 1994.

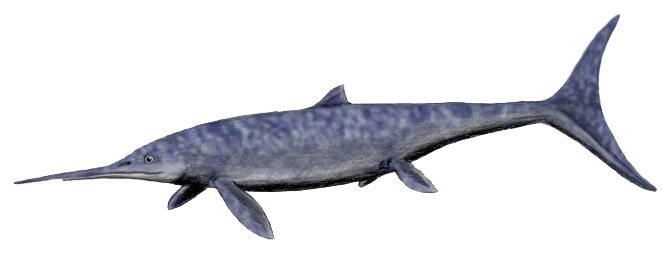
Artist's restoration of Excalibosaurus

- German paleontologist Jurgen Reiss speculated that ichthyosaurs swam using their front flippers the way modern penguins do rather than propelling themselves with their tail flukes.
- McGowan named the ichthyosaur with an unusually long, protruding upper jaw from Somerset Excalibosaurus, because it was found in the same general region where the legendary King Arthur obtained his sword.

==== 1987 ====
- Mazin described the new species Omphalosaurus nettarhynchus.

==== 1988 ====
- Massare and Callaway described a pregnant Mixosaurus specimen discovered in the Alps near the border between Switzerland and Italy. The specimen represented the oldest known evidence for live birth in ichthyosaurs.
- Three specimens attributable to a new Triassic ichthyosaur were discovered near Phattalung, Thailand by a man named Chongpan Chonglakmani.

==== 1989 ====
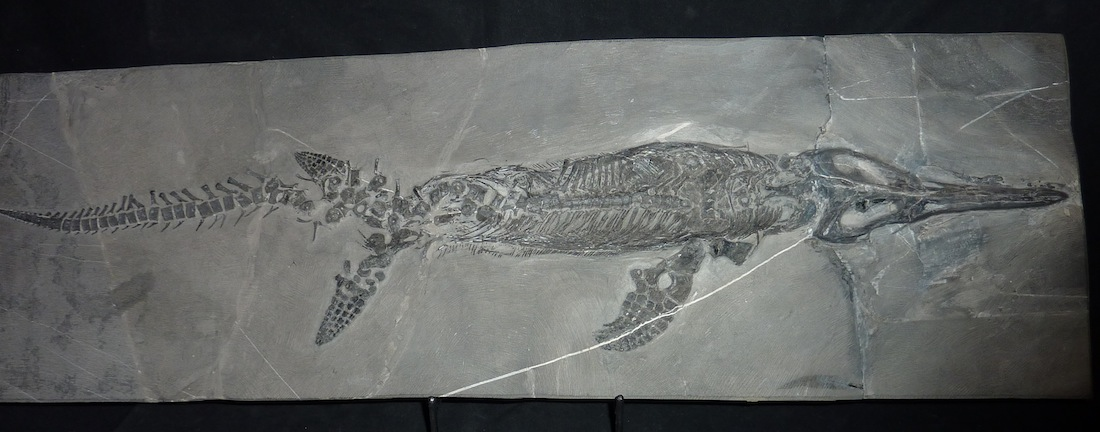
Skeleton of Mixosaurus

- In Dorset, England, a new specimen of Grendelius was discovered. However, when Christoper McGowan studied this new specimen he realized that while distinct from Ophthalmosaurus, Grendelius was apparently the same as the previously named genus Brachypterygius and the names were synonymized.
- McGowan observed that many Leptonectes specimens have somewhat protruding upper jaws.
- Remains of a Triassic ichthyosaur were discovered in Sonora, Mexico.
- Callaway and Massare regarded the genus Phalarodon as a nomen dubium.
- Sander described the new species Cymbospondylus buchseri.

=== 1990s ===
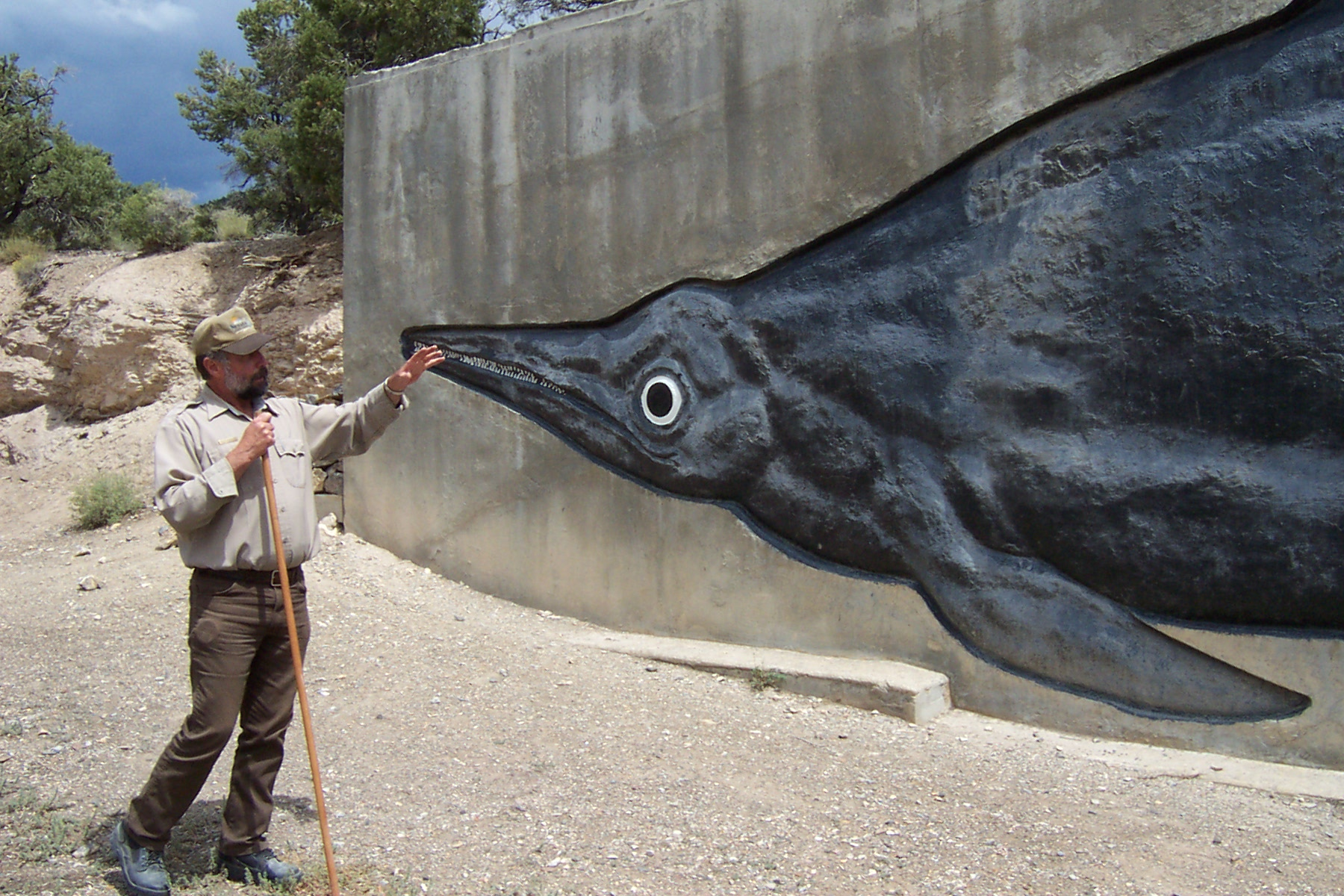
A tour guide describes Shonisaurus at Berlin-Ichthyosaur State Park

==== 1990 ====
- Bradley Kosch of Berlin-Ichthyosaur State Park criticized Camp's 1980 reconstruction of the park's famous Shonisaurus popularis as having too short a backbone and overly deep ribs, responsible for its supposedly deep pot belly. He noted that the illustration differed from both the text of Camp's published description and his own private field notes.
- Stephen Jay Gould published an article about the tail bend in ichthyosaurs.
- De Buffrenil and Mazin found a woven texture in the bones of Ichthyosaurus, Omphalosaurus, and Stenopterygius. This texture is found only in the bones of quickly growing animals, suggesting that ichthyosaurs had high metabolic rates and may even have been warm blooded.
- Massare and Callaway observed that Triassic ichthyosaurs had more elongated body plans than their Jurassic successors.

==== 1991 ====
- An archaeologist named Keary Walde discovered large fossil bones near the Sikanni Chief River. He reported his discovery to the Royal Tyrell Museum. The museum's curator, Elizabeth Nicholls, was also a respected marine reptile researcher, visited the site.
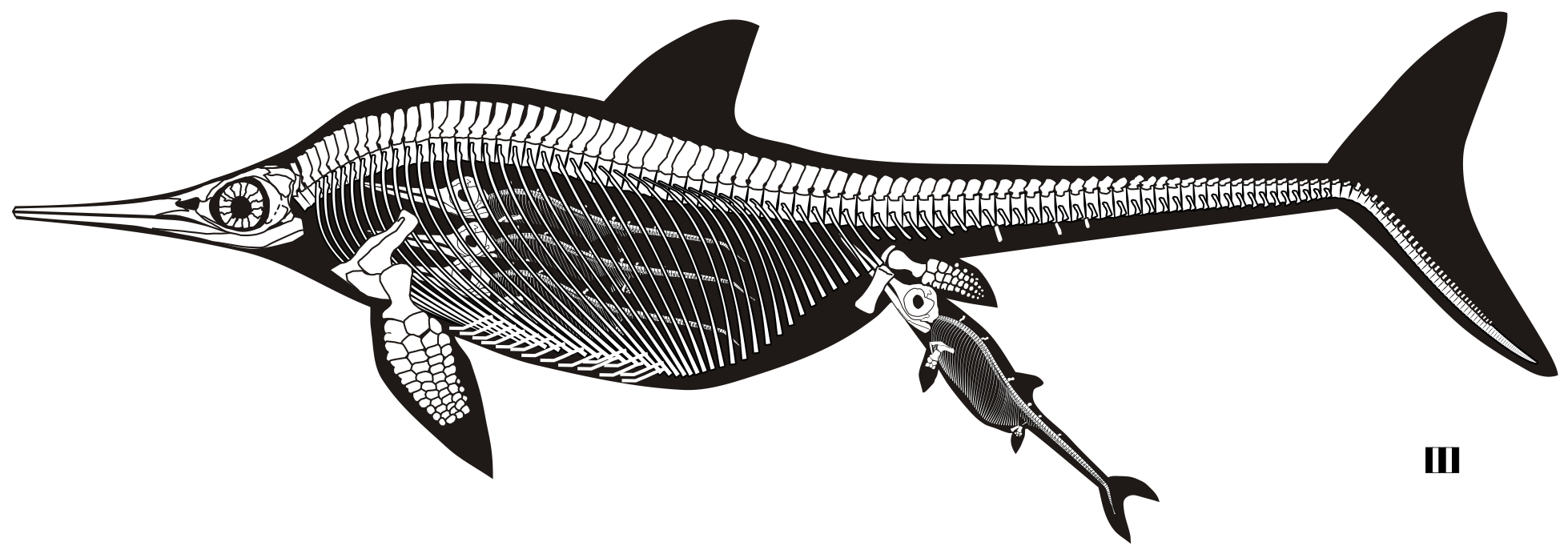
  Skeletal reconstruction of a Stenopterygius with young partially evacuated from the birth canal. These specimens may not reflect the preservation of mothers in the act of giving birth, but deceased feti being expelled from her by pressure resulting from gas build up in her bloating carcass.
  She was astonished to realize that the bones discovered by Walde were the remains of an ichthyosaur roughly 75 feet long, one and a half times as big as the largest known ichthyosaur at the time.
- McGowan argued that ichthyosaur fossils with new-born remains protruding from the birth canal don't imply that the mother died giving birth. Instead, they could be expelled from an already dead mother by the pressure of gas-build up as her rotting carcass bloated. An example of this in modern marine life was documented where the carcasses of beached false killer whales were given a shallow burial. Several months later, the pregnant females' fetuses had been partly expelled. He also observed that roughly 35 ichthyosaur specimens a year were still being recovered from Holzmaden. He suggested that at least some ichthyosaurs may have been warm-blooded and swift swimming like modern tuna due to their similar body plans. He also noted that even if they weren't warm blooded their large body mass would help maintain stable body temperatures.
- Lingham-Soliar referred to the swimming style of advanced ichthyosaurs whose body remained stiff while large muscles powered the tail's swimming stroke as "axial oscillation".
- Mazin and others described the new genus and species Thaisaurus chonglakmanii.

==== 1992 ====
- Field work on behalf of Alberta's Royal Tyrell Museum began in the Pink Mountains of British Columbia 60 miles north of where Christopher McGowan's field work was conducted. The Royal Tyrell researchers would discover Late Triassic ichthyosaur remains in the sediments of the Pardonet Formation.

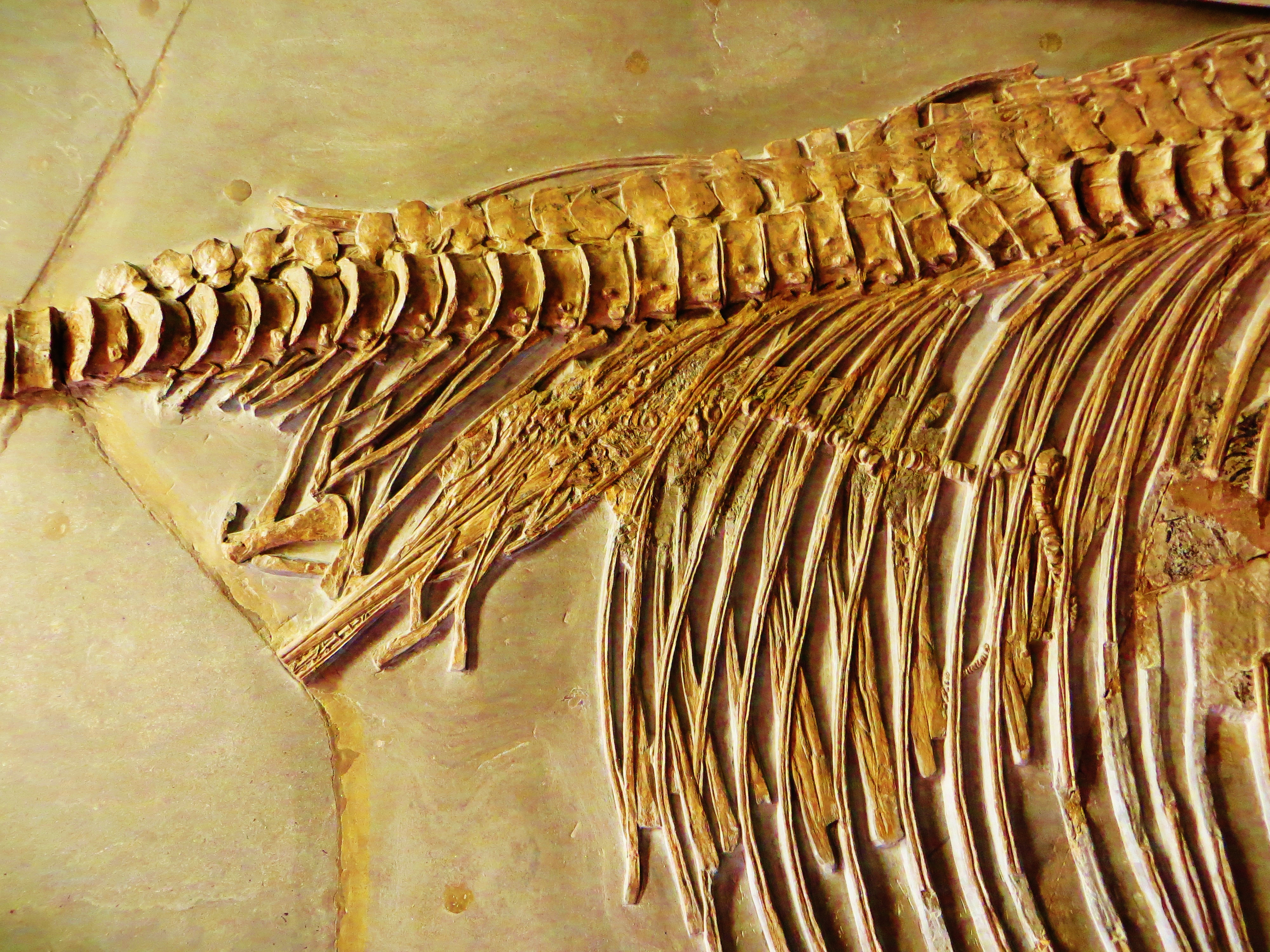
Close-up photograph of a Stenopterygius embryo

- Judy Massare proposed an explanation for the high percentage of pregnant Stenopterygius at Holzmaden. She speculated that the area was used as a breeding ground, the way whales congregate to give birth in areas of shallow water today. The coordination of a large number of births at the same time and place would increase the young's chances of survival because there would be too many for the local predator population to eat. Massare suggested that another ichthyosaur genus, Leptopterygius (now known as Leptonectes), was one such local predator that may have fed on vulnerable young ichthyosaurs.
- Nathalie Bardet dismissed claims of ichthyosaur fossils from rocks of more recent age than the Cenomanian. She also discussed possible causes for the extinction of the ichthyosaurs. She expressed doubt that ichthyosaurs were replaced by mosasaurs because they would not be in direct competition with each other. Instead she posited a connection to an extinction event that affected cephalopods at the boundary between the Cenomanian and Turonian ages. She proposed that the disappearance of these many cephalopod species may have deprived ichthyosaurs of their food source and caused their extinction.

==== 1993 ====
- Charles Deeming and others published a paper on the 1985 ichthyosaur embryo discovered in Somerset. They observed that many pregnant ichthyosaur specimens contain fetuses oriented head-first toward the birth canal even though they were probably born tail-first as a precaution to prevent drowning. This suggests that there may have been complications during the pregnancy, like the fetus being too large to pass through the birth canal. If the decomposing fetus remained trapped in the mother, it would very likely kill her.

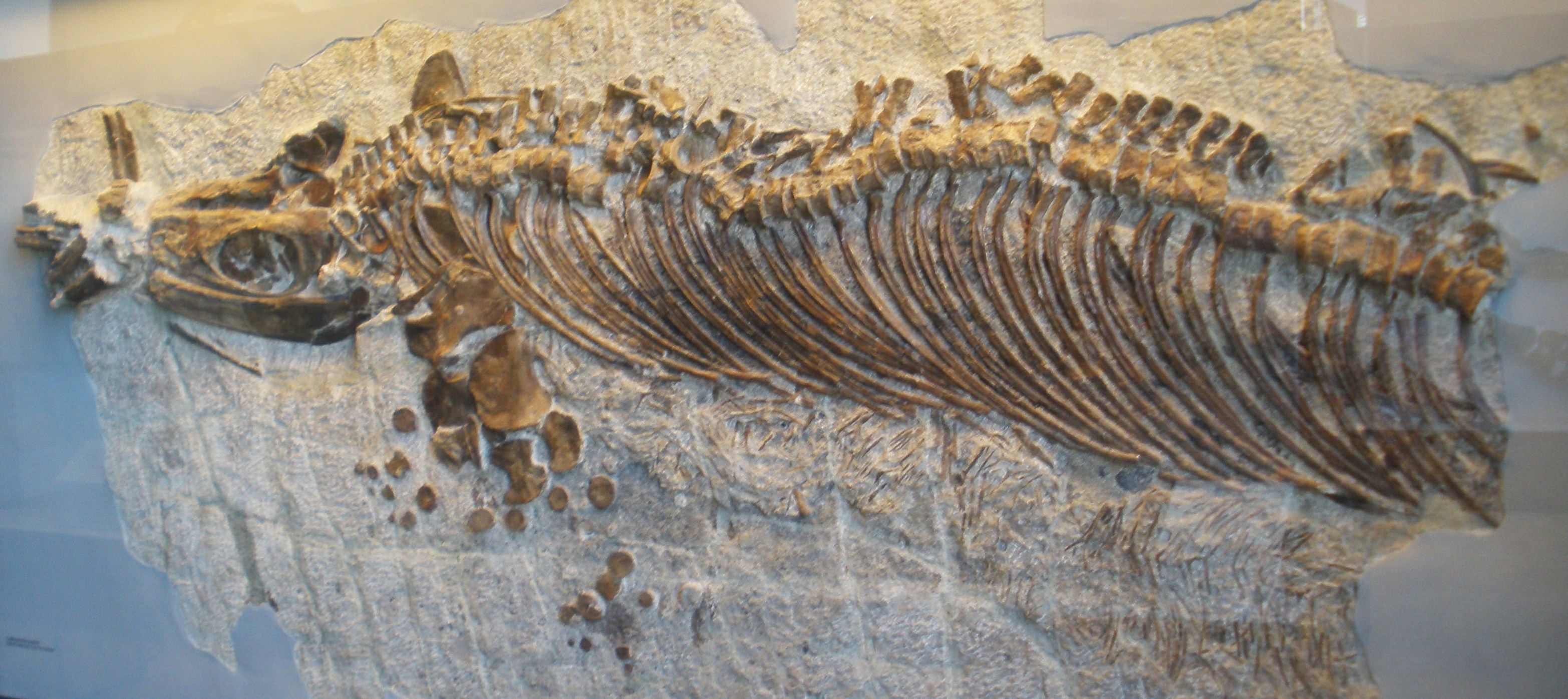
Fossils of Cymbospondylus

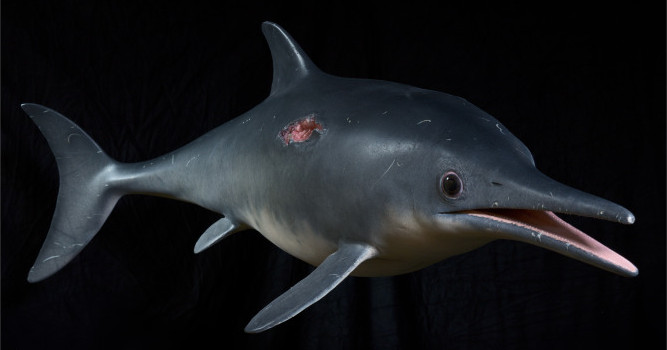
Artist's restoration of Stenopterygius

- Jennifer Hogler re-examined the tails of the early large ichthyosaurs Cymbospondylus and Shonisaurus, finding the wedge-shaped vertebrae that form the tail-bend that composes the tail fluke. This find contradicted the widespread idea that these early ichthyosaurs had straight tails and therefore lacked well-developed flukes.
- Russell described the species that would later come to be known as Arthropterygius chrisorum.
- McGowan described the species that would later come to be known as Leptonectes solei.

==== 1994 ====
- Axel Hungerbuhler bemoaned the taxonomic confusion caused by German geologist Friedrich Quenstedt's early research on the ichthyosaurs at Holzmaden. He attributed the bulk of this confusion to Quenstedt's unorthodox naming practices, which often exceeded the two-named binomials of standard biological nomenclature to consist of three or four names. Further, the fossils themselves were poorly organized and many of the type specimens he founded species on were unlabeled. Hungerbuhler named two new species of his own: Stenopterygius cuniceps and S. macrophasma.
- Christopher McGowan named the new species of Shastasaurus discovered in British Columbia S. neoscapularis. He also reviewed the species previously referred to the genus, finding many of them to be dubious, like S. altus, S. careyi, S. carinthiacus, and S. osmonti. However, two previously described species, the type, S. pacificus, and the referred species S. alexandrae were found to be valid. He criticized Merriam for oversplitting Shastasaurus because most of the resulting names were useless and mislead the paleontological community into thinking that the genus was better understood than it really was.
- Fernandez described the new ichthyosaur genus Chacaisaurus from the Vaca Muerta Formation of Argentina.
- Bardet and others reported Platypterygius fossils from late Cenomanian rocks in Bavaria. These were the remains latest known ichthyosaurs.
- Fernández described the species that would later come to be known as Stenopterygius cayi.

==== 1995 ====
- January: A man named Chris Moore discovered much of the front half of an ichthyosaur skeleton in the Belemnite Marls of Seatown, Dorset. The specimen was a juvenile of a new Leptopterygius species, named L. moorei after Moore. In life, the specimen was probably about 8 feet long.

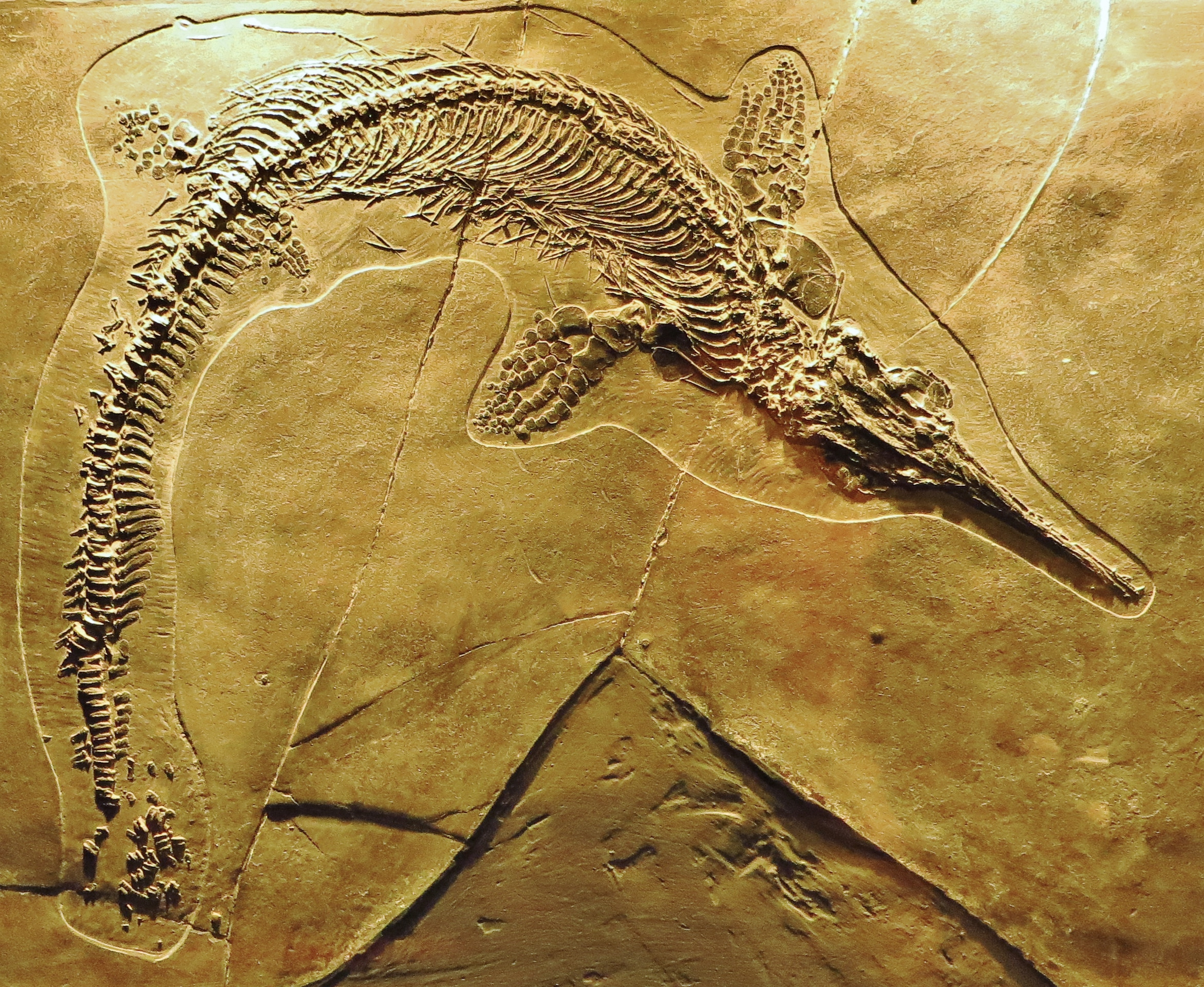
Skeleton of Mixosaurus

- McGowan renamed the ichthyosaur genus Leptopterygius to Leptonectes. He also synonymized Leptopterygius with Temnodontosaurus. He also described the new genus and species Hudsonelpidia brevirostris.
- Martill claimed that despite an abundance of ichthyosaur specimens with preserved soft tissue, there was no evidence that ichthyosaur skin was covered in scales.
- Tichy described the new species Omphalosaurus wolfi.
- Nicholls and Brinkman described the new genus and species Parvinatator wapitiensis.

==== 1996 ====
- Motani and others argued that sharks are the best modern analogues for ichthyosaurs because of their similar body plans.
- McGowan reported the serendipitous discovery of evidence for a new giant ichthyosaur species in a museum collection. He was studying the ichthyosaur fossils curated by the National Academy of Sciences in Philadelphia. One Early Jurassic bone catalogued as a part of a shoulder (the coracoid) he recognized as actually being a gigantic skull bone (the quadrate). The misidentification was probably due to the quadrate's exceptionally large size as the coracoid is generally one of the larger bones in the ichthyosaur body. The implication of such a large quadrate being found was the existence a previously unknown ichthyosaur of similar or greater size to Shonisaurus itself. In life this animal may have been more than 50 feet long. He also described the new genus Leptonectes as well as the species that would later come to be known as Macgowania janiceps.
- Motani, You, and McGowan observed that the primitive ichthyosaur Chensaurus had had a relatively large number of vertebrae. This suggests that it swam in an eel-like fashion. The researchers interpreted the course of ichthyosaur evolution as starting with an eel-like body plan, transitioning to a jack-like body plan, and reaching its culmination in a tuna-like body plan.
- Dal Sasso and Pinna described the new genus and species Besanosaurus leptorhynchus.

==== 1997 ====
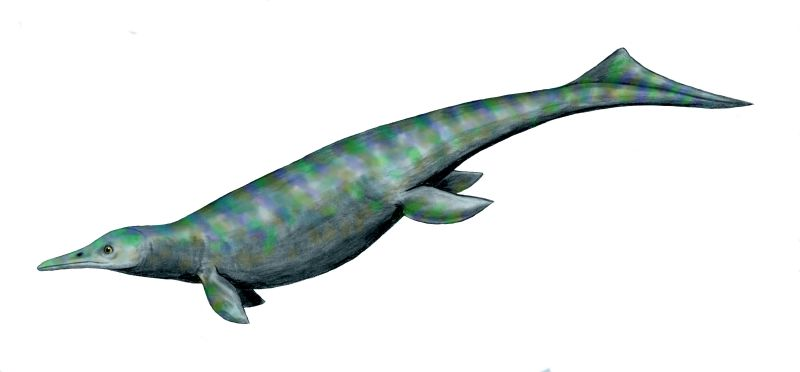
Artist's restoration of Utatsusaurus

- Ryosuke Motani completed his doctoral dissertation: "Phylogeny of the Ichthyosauria with Special Reference to Triassic Forms".
- Callaway argued that it was inaccurate to refer to ichthyosaurs as ichthyopterygians.
- Callaway examined the mixosaurid fossils housed at the natural history museum in Zürich. He regarded only two species of Mixosaurus to be valid; M. cornalianus and M. atavus. He regarded M. maotaiensis, M. natans, and M. nordeskioeldii as junior synonyms of those species. He also regarded several species in the genus Phalarodon as synonymous with the two valid Mixosaurus species.
- Martin Sander of the Institute for Paleontology in Bonn named the ichthyosaur found in Karlstadt, Germany Shastasaurus neubigi in honor of its discoverer. The specimen originated in the Muschelkalk, which was deposited in a shallow sea. Because the waters were so shallow and large ichthyosaurs are so infrequently found in the Muschelkalk Sander speculated that the ichthyosaur entered the region where it would later fossilize by accident in a deviation from the normal range of the species.
- Fernández described the new genus and species Caypullisaurus bonapartei.
- Maisch and Matzke described the new genus and species Mikadocephalus gracilirostris.
- Arkhangelsky described the species that would later come to be known as Ophthalmosaurus saveljeviensis.
- Efimov described the species that would later come to be known as Platypterygius bedengensis.
- Páramo described the new species Platypterygius sachicarum

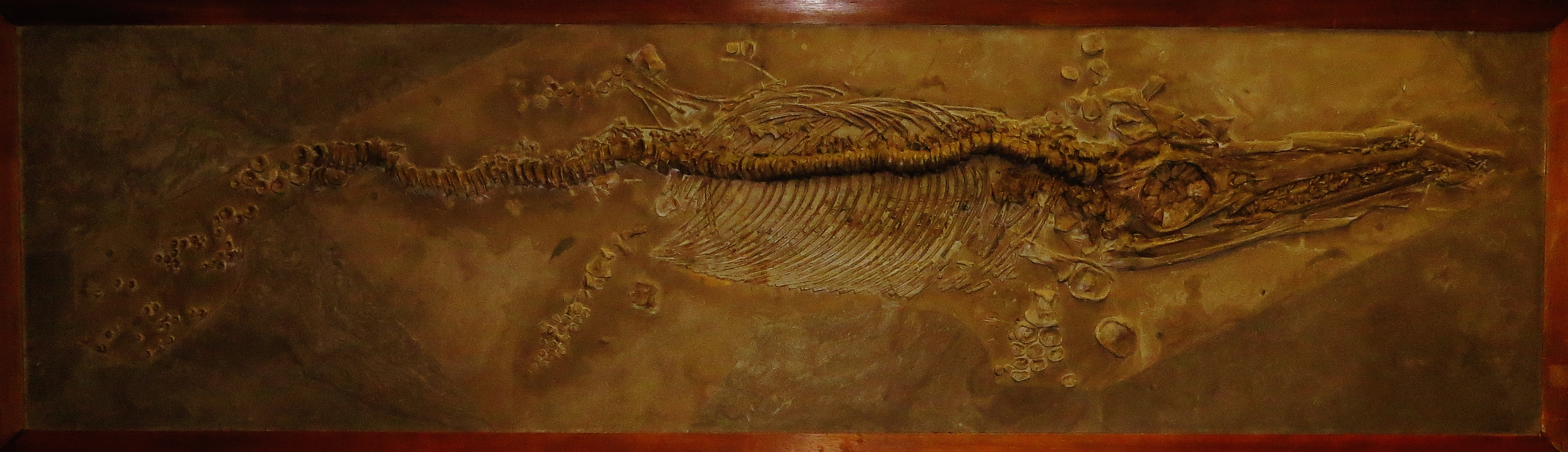
Skeleton of Suevoleviathan

==== 1998 ====
- Motani, Minoura, and Ando published a discussion of the ichthyosaur Utatsusaurus. They noted its primitive position in the ichthyosaur family tree and the same number of vertebrae in the front part of its body as modern catsharks. They interpreted Utatsusaurus as a maneuverable shallow water predator that swam with eel-like undulations along most of its body length.

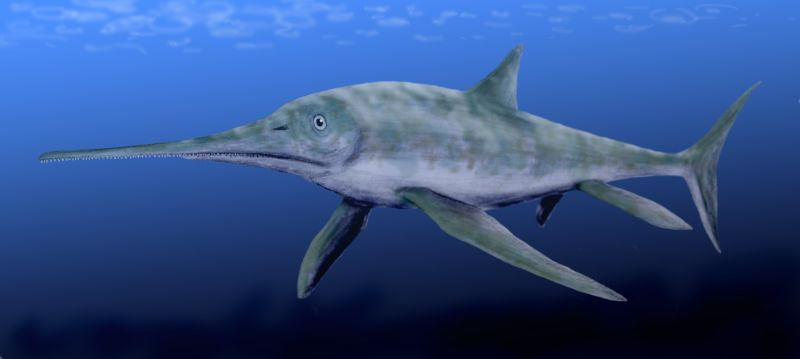
Artist's restoration of Eurhinosaurus

- Maisch named the family Leptonectidae for a clade including Eurhinosaurus, Excalibosaurus, and Leptonectes. Distinguishing traits of the family include their large eyes, long flippers consisting of three or four main "digits", and their long over-biting snouts.
- Maisch and Matzke erected the genus Wimanius. The generic name honored Carl Wiman, who performed notable research on Triassic ichthyosaurs. They also named the species Wimanius odontopalatus.
- Maisch and Matzke described the new genus Contectopalatus. It had a high crest running the midlength of its cranium for jaw muscle attachment giving it a powerful bite. It also would have been about 16 feet long in life, making it twice as long as any previously discovered mixosaurid.
- Maisch erected the genus Suevoleviathan to house the species Leptopterygius disinteger.
- Darren Naish debunked the 1986 claim by Jurgen Riess that ichthyosaurs swam with their front flippers rather than their tail flukes. He concluded "if an animal has a propulsive surface on the end of its tail, it uses it."

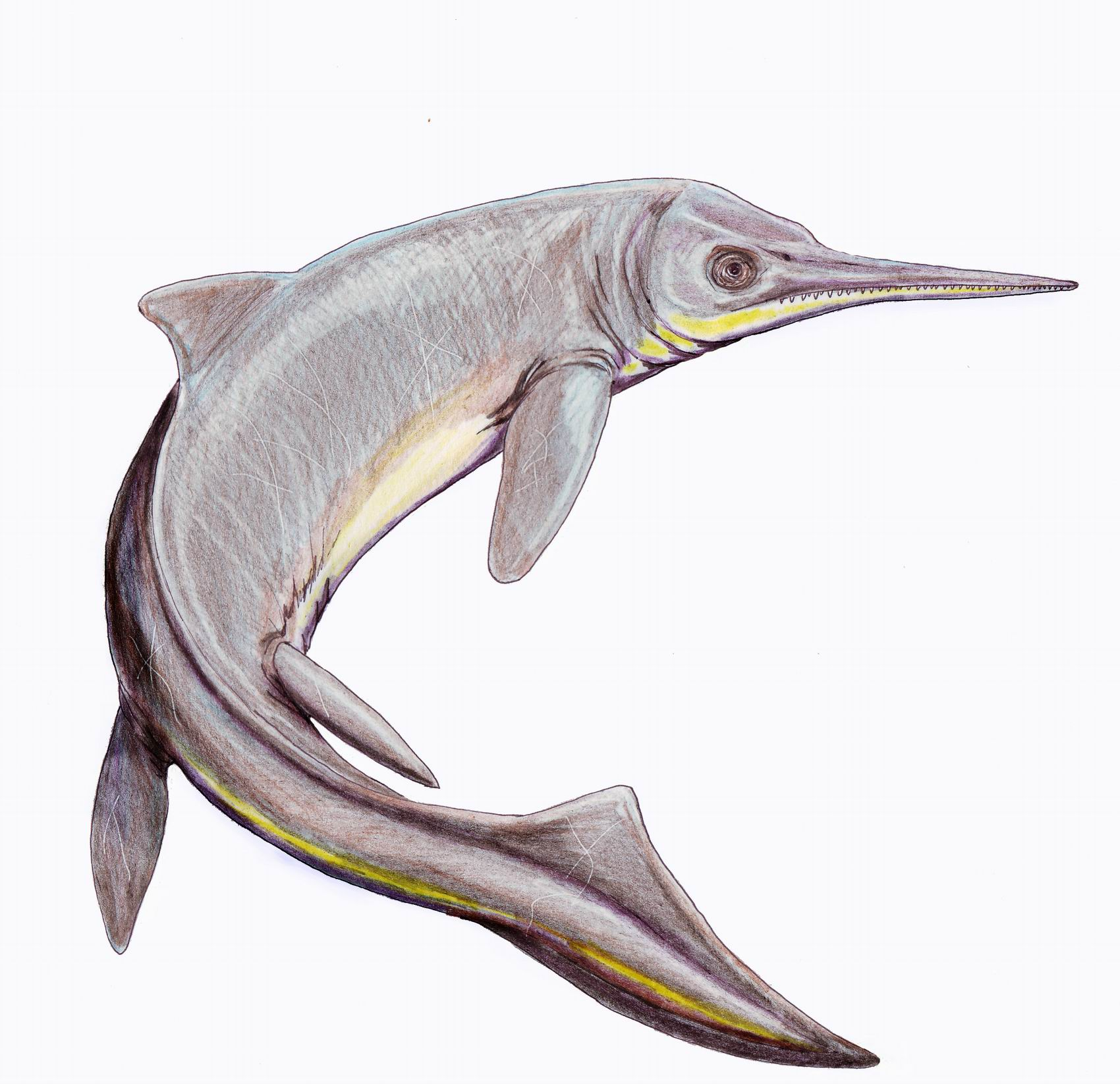
Artist's restoration of Contectopalatus

- Efimov described the species that would later come to be known as Brachypterygius pseudoscythius.
- Brinkmann described the species that would later come to be known as Mixosaurus kuhnschnyderi.

==== 1999 ====
- Ryosuke Motani published a phylogeny of the ichthyosaurs. Motani regarded Thaisaurus as "incertae sedis" due to its pronounced similarity to Chaohusaurus and how little was known about its fossils. He also erected two new genera, Macgowania (named in honor of McGowan) and Isfjordosaurus (named after Isfjord, Spitsbergen).
- The expedition to the Sikanni Chief River, British Columbia led by Elizabeth Nicholls of the Royal Tyrell Museum excavated the animal's 18 foot long skull, which had to be split into pieces for removal. These pieces were so heavy a cargo helicopter was needed to transport them. The largest weighed 8,860 lbs.
- McGowan and Motani reported the results of their re-examination of the Shonisaurus specimens described by Camp from Berlin-Ichthyosaur state park. They concluded that of the three species Camp described from among the remains, only the type and most abundant species S. popularis was valid. The other two species he named, S. silberlingi and S. mulleri, were merely junior synonyms of S. popularis.
- Motani, Rothschild, and Wahl found that Temnodontosaurus had eyes up to 10 inches in diameter, the largest known of any animal.
- Fernandez described the new ichthyosaur genus Mollesaurus from the Los Molles Formation of Argentina. He also described the species Mollesaurus periallus.

A reconstructed skeleton of Undorosaurus

- Chun Li described the new ichthyosaur genus Qianichthyosaurus from Guizhou Province, China.
- Lingham-Soliar proposed a model for ichthyosaur extinction whereby the evolution of fishes capable of greater swimming speeds during the Cretaceous favored ambush predators like plesiosaurs and the newly evolved mosasaurs over the ichthyosaurs, who succumbed to the competition.
- McGowan and Milner described the new species Leptonectes moorei.
- Efimov described the new genus and species Undorosaurus gorodischensis. Efimov also described the species that would later come to be known as Ophthalmosaurus yasikovi.
- Li described the new genus and species Qianichthyosaurus zhoui.

March 6th

- An article about ichthyosaurs called "Dinodolphin" by Kate Douglas was published in New Scientist magazine.

September

- Rothschild, Motani, and Wahl presented an abstract to a meeting of the Society for Vertebrate Paleontology. There they reported evidence that some Ophthalmosaurus suffered from the bends.

== 21st century ==
=== 2000s ===
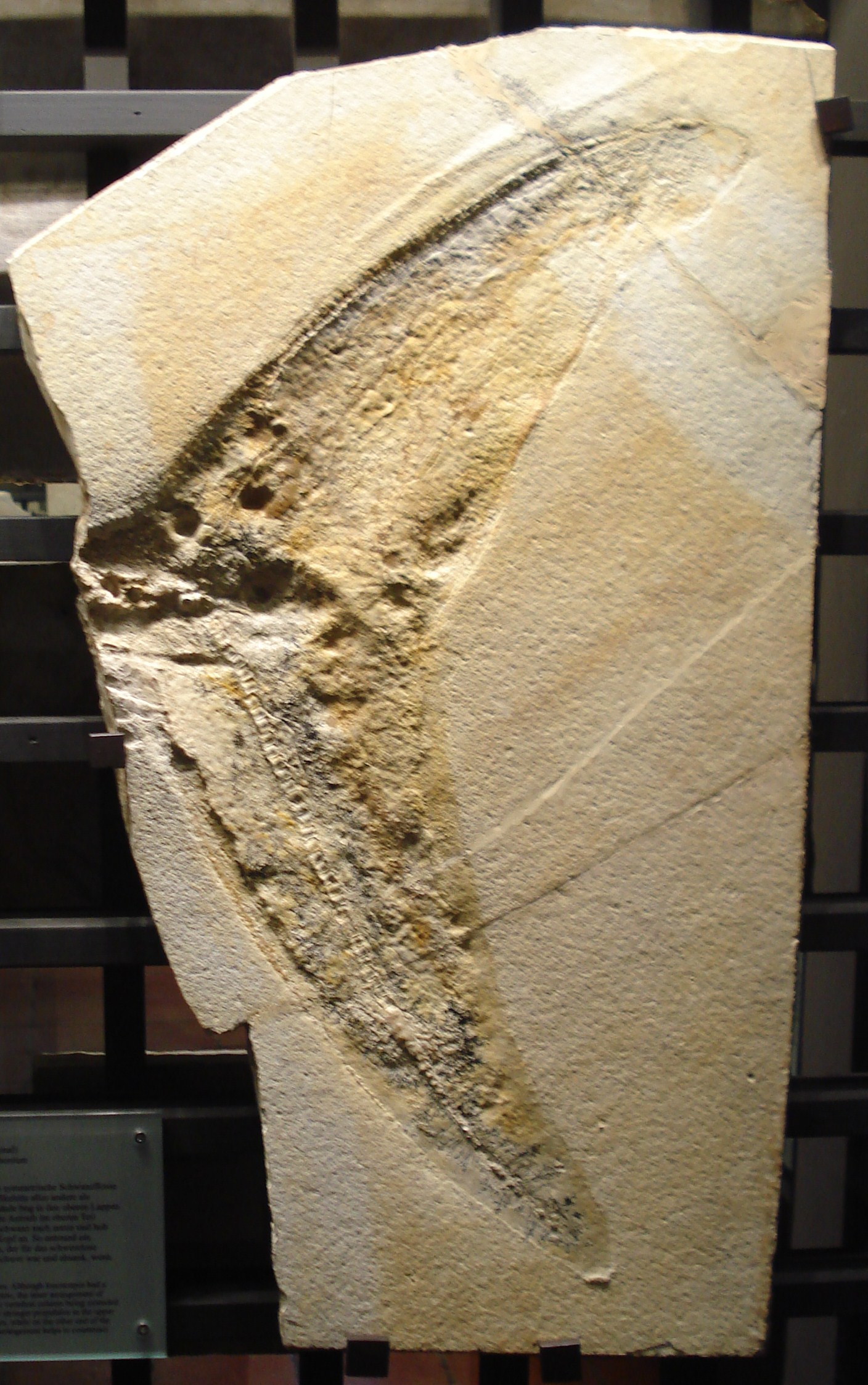
Tail fluke of Aegirosaurus

==== 2000 ====
- Ryosuke Motani published an article on ichthyosaurs in Scientific American that documented the discovery of Utatsusaurus.
- Swiss watch maker Rolex honored Elizabeth Nicholls as a Rolex Laureate and bestowed on her a $100,000 stipend, covering much of the expenses generated by her field work.
- Sander expressed doubt as to whether or not Omphalosaurus was really an ichthyosaur. He also cast doubt on the idea that the limb bones from Spitsbergen referred to the genus by Carl Wiman actually belonged to the same kind of animal as the jaws discovered by J. C. Merriam that served as its type specimen.
- Maisch and Matzke erected the new genus Callawayia for the species Shastasaurus neoscapularis. They also erected the new genus Phantomosaurus.
- Yin and others described the new genus and species Guizhouichthyosaurus tangae. They also described the species that would later come to be known as Shastasaurus liangae.

May

- Nathalie Bardet and Marta Fernandez erected the new genus Aegirosaurus to house the species Ichthyosaurus leptospondylus. This was first new ichthyosaur to be described from the Solnhofen lithographic limestone in over 50 years prior to its naming. The type specimen preserved extensive soft tissue traces. Bardet and Fernandez reported the presence of tiny scales covering the animal. They disagreed with Martill, who claimed in 1995 that no evidence of a scaley covering existed in ichthyosaurs.

==== 2001 ====
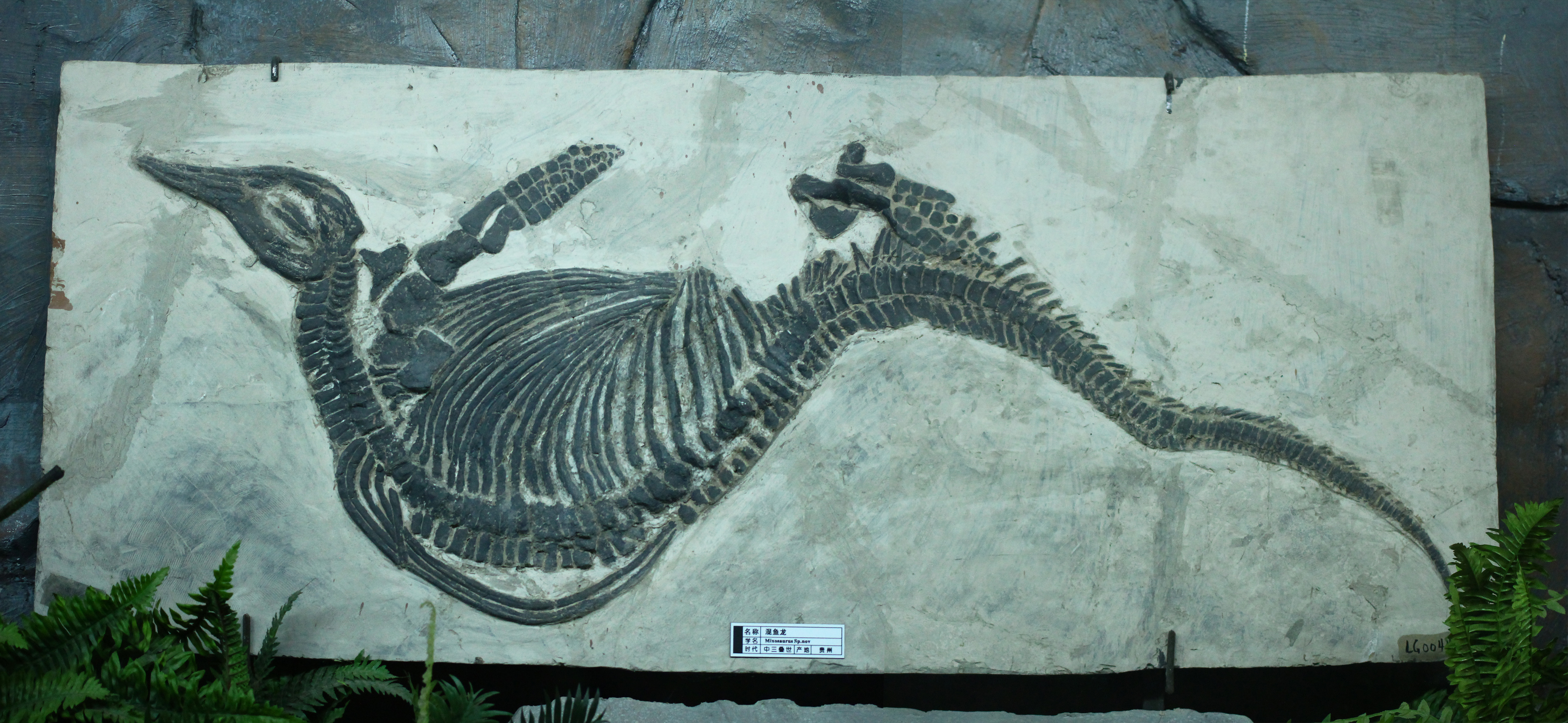
Skeleton of Mixosaurus

- Maisch and Matzke recognized the genus Phalarodon as diagnostic rather than dubious. They referred the species "Mixsaurus" major of the German Muschelkalk to that genus, and noted that this represented the first report of Phalarodon in that locality.
- Nicholls and Manabe erected the new genus Metashastasaurus for the species Shastasaurus neoscapularis. However, since the genus Callawayia had already been named for this species by Maisch and Matzke it was never accepted as valid by the scientific community. Nicholls and Manabe also reported that since field work began in the Pardonet Formation of British Columbia's Pink Mountains, 65 ichthyosaur specimens had been recovered.
- Orndorff and others interpreted the burial site of the famous ichthyosaurs of Berlin-Ichthyosaur State Park as a deep ocean shelf rather than a shallow coastal area. They also proposed a new reinterpretation of the animal's deaths, suggesting that the deposit may represent a school of Shonisaurus that was paralyzed by neurotoxins in the fish or shellfish that they ate before sinking to their death. They compared their hypothesis to modern mass whale deaths off the coast of New England. However, this interpretation is considered doubtful as there is no evidence linking mass whale deaths with consumption of poisonous sealife.
- Dino Frey and others reported the presence of ichthyosaur vertebrae in the collection of the Faculty of Geoscience in Linares, Mexico. They expressed interest in returning to Mexico to study the remains further and search for new finds.
- Paleontologist Ben Kear collaborated with radiographer George Kourlis to perform a CT scan of Platypterigius. They found that its inner ear bones were so thick that they could not transmit sound vibrations and concluded animal must have been deaf. The scan also exposed the sensory structures inside its nose that allowed it to smell as well as an unusual system of "channels and grooves". The researchers found embryonic remains inside a Platypteriguis from Hughenden, Queensland, as well as the remains of the belemnites, fish, and turtle hatchlings it ate.
- Arkhangelsky described the species that would later come to be known as Brachypterygius alekseevi.

==== 2002 ====
- Li and You described the new species Cymbospondylus asiaticus. The known remains of this species consisted of two skulls excavated from the Late Triassic Falang Formation of Guizhou Province, China. This was the first known example of the genus in Asia.
- Perkins speculated that the channels and grooves uncovered by Kear and Kourlis in the skull of Platypterigius via CT scan formed an electrosensory system similar to those possessed by modern sharks.
- Peter Doyle gave an interview to New Scientist magazine discussing acid-etched belemnite shells, that he believed originated as ichthyosaur vomit.
- Ryosuke Motani compared the bodies and hydrodynamics of aquatic life with a "thunniform" body plan like dolphins, lamnid sharks, tunas, and the ichthyosaur Stenopterygius quadriscissus. He modeled the motions of a thunniform body and its interaction with the water finding that, contrary to the conclusions of previous research, the tail fin of a thunniform animal was evolved to enable cruising at large body sizes rather than for "propuslive efficiency". He hypothesized that the similar body plans shared between ichthyosaurs and tunas suggest similar high swimming speeds and metabolic rates.

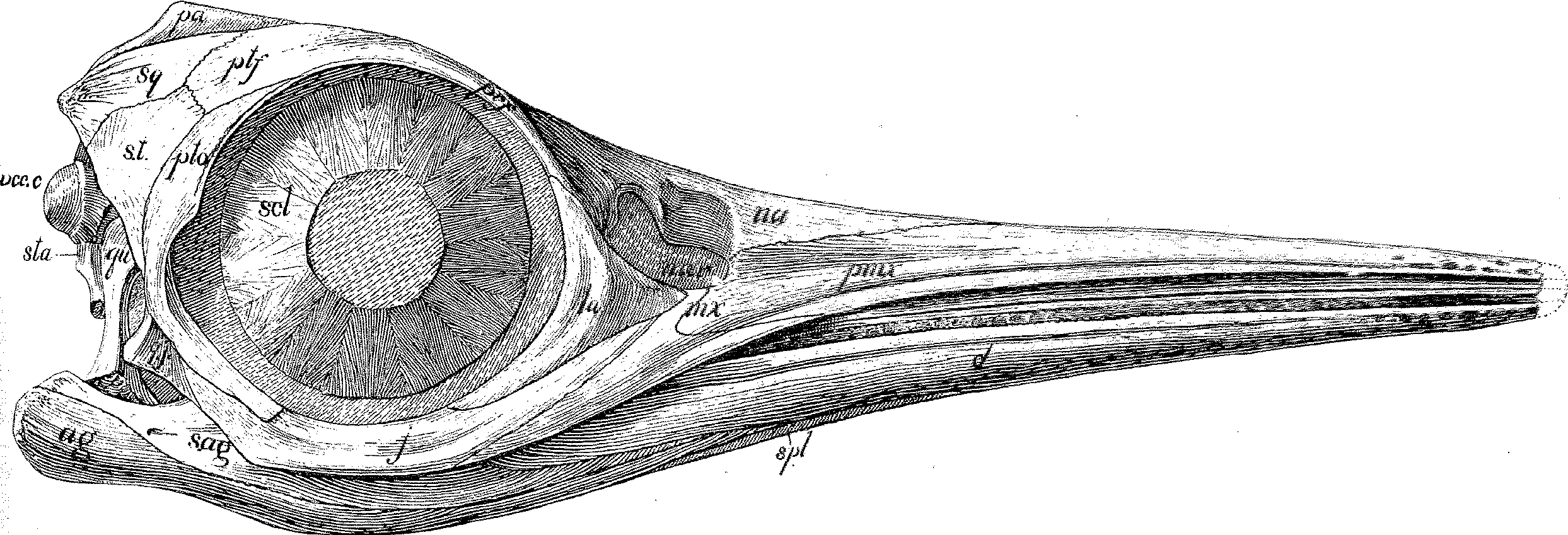
Illustration of an Ophthalmosaurus skull

- Stuart Humphries and Graeme Ruxton published a study on the eyes of Ophthalmosaurus. They calculated its eyes to be two and half to four times as light sensitive as the modern elephant seal. Since elephant seals can themselves dive thousands of feet deep, the researchers concluded that increased light sensitivity in deep water was probably not the only evolutionary pressure behind the evolution of large eyes in Ophthalmosaurus. Its large eyes would have given it exceptionally clear vision as well, which would have been useful for tracking small prey and in possible social behavior.
- Thegarten Lingham-Soliar argued against Nathalie Bardet's attribution of ichthyosaur extinction to the loss of their preferred food sources in the Cenomanian-Turonian extinction event expanded on his own 1999 attribution of ichthyosaur extinction to biotic factors. During the Cretaceous the evolution of many fish groups trended towards faster swimming body types, making them harder to hunt for adult ichthyosaurs and harder to escape from for newborn ichthyosaurs. This ecological scene favored ambush predators like plesiosaurs and the newly evolved mosasaurs over the ichthyosaurs, who succumbed to the competition.
- Maisch and Lehmann described the new species Omphalosaurus peyeri.

==== 2003 ====
- Elizabeth Nicholls, Chen Wei, and Makato Manabe published an extensive description of a new, complete specimen of Qianichthyosaurus from Guizhou. They observed that it was very similar to the genus Toretocnemus from California and concluded that similar ichthyosaur faunas spanned the Pacific Ocean during the Late Triassic.
- Maisch and Matzke described the new genus and species Quasianosteosaurus vikinghoegdai.

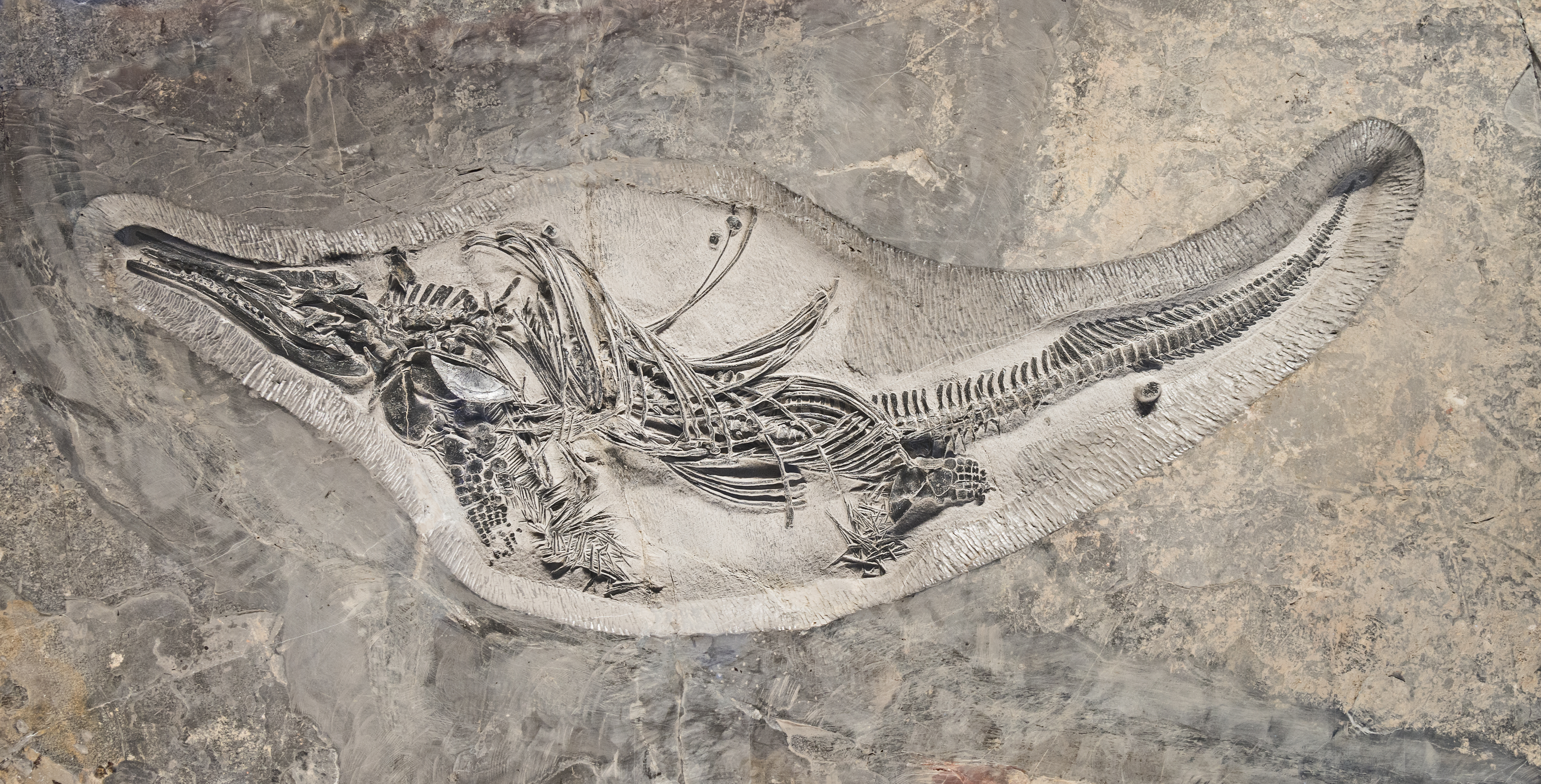
A fossilized skeleton of Barracudasauroides panxianensis

==== 2004 ====
- Schmitz and others described the species that would later come to be known as Phalarodon callawayi.
- Nicholls and Manabe described the species that would later come to be known as Shastasaurus sikkaniensis.

==== 2006 ====
- Maxwell and Caldwell described the new genus and species Maiaspondylus lindoei.
- Jiang and others described the species that would later come to be known as Barracudasauroides panxianensis.
- Fröbisch, Sander and Rieppel described the new species Cymbospondylus nichollsi.

==== 2007 ====
- Chen, Cheng, and Sander described the species that would later come to be known as Guizhouichthyosaurus wolongangensis.

==== 2008 ====
- Maisch described the new genus and species Hauffiopteryx typicus.
- Arkhangelsky and others described the new species Platypterygius ochevi.
- Jiang and others described the new genus and species Xinminosaurus catactes.

=== 2010s ===
==== 2010 ====
- Maxwell described the new genus Arthropterygius
- Druckenmiller and Maxwell described the new genus and species Athabascasaurus bitumineus

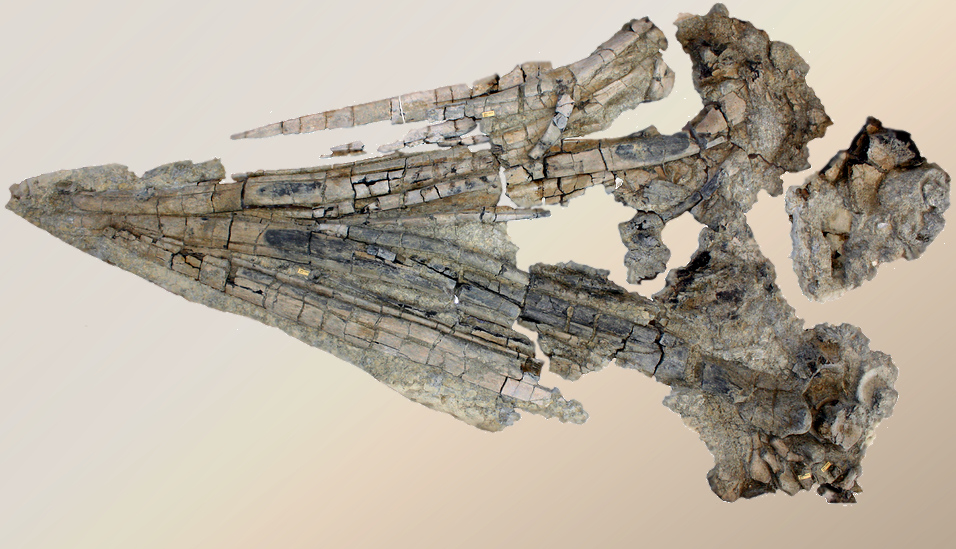
Skull bones of Acamptonectes.

- Maisch described the new genus Barracudasauroides and new species Omphalosaurus merriami
- Chen and Cheng described the new species Mixosaurus xindianensis

==== 2011 ====
- Fischer and others described the new genus and species Sveltonectes insolitus

==== 2012 ====
- Fischer and others described the new genus and species Acamptonectes densus
- Druckenmiller and others described the new genera and species Cryopterygius kristiansenae and Palvennia hoybergeti
- Maxwell, Fernández, and Schoch described the new species Stenopterygius aaleniensis
- Martin and others described the new species Temnodontosaurus azerguensis

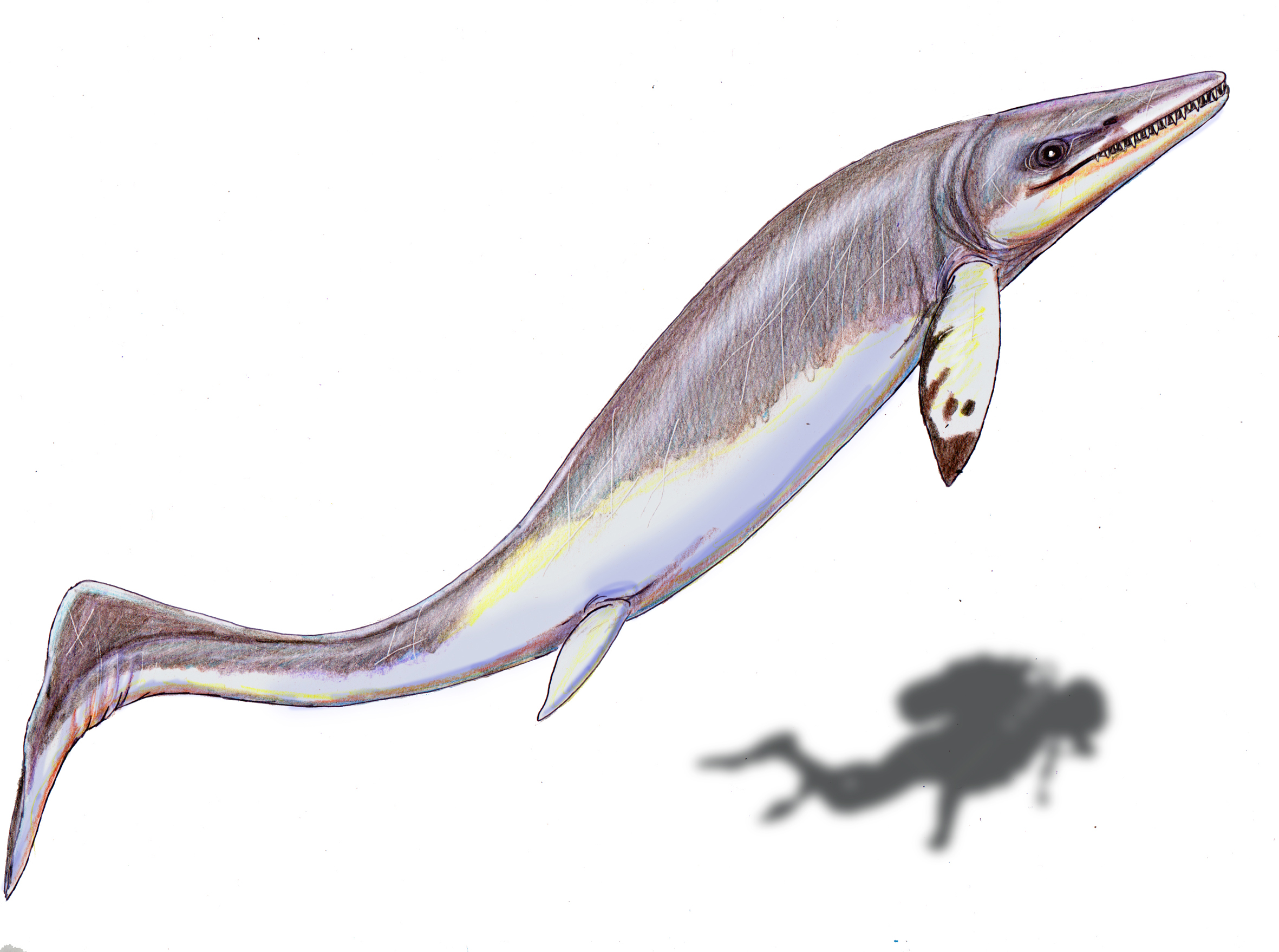
Artist's restoration of Thalattoarchon.

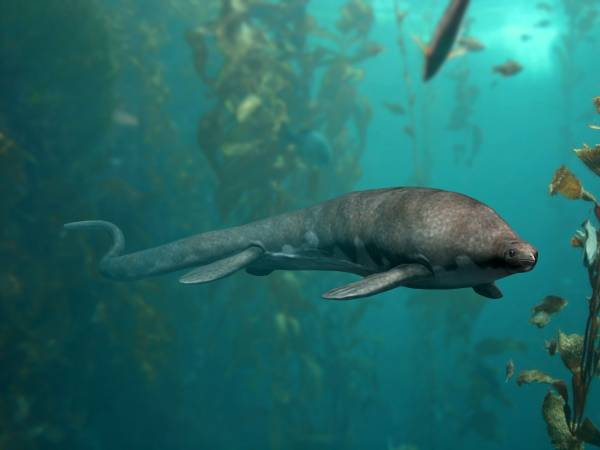
Artist's restoration of Sclerocormus.

==== 2013 ====
- Chen and others described the new species Chaohusaurus zhangjiawanensis
- Cuthbertson, Russell and Anderson described the new genus and species Gulosaurus helmi
- Fischer and others described the new genus and species Malawania anachronus
- Fischer and others described the new genus and species Leninia stellans.
- Fröbisch and others described the new genus and species Thalattoarchon saurophagis

==== 2014 ====
- Roberts and others described the new genus and species Janusaurus lundi
- Fischer and others described the new genus and species Sisteronia seeleyi
- Arkhangelsky and Zverkov described the new species Undorosaurus trautscholdi
- Fischer and others described the new genus and species Leninia stellans.
- Anatomy, taxonomy and phylogenetic relationships of Cretaceous ophthalmosaurids Simbirskiasaurus birjukovi and Pervushovisaurus bannovkensis are reevaluated by Fischer et al. (2014).

==== 2015 ====
- Motani and others described the new genus and species Cartorhynchus lenticarpus
- Brusatte and others described the new genus and species Dearcmhara shawcrossi
- Chen and others described the new genus and species Eretmorhipis carrolldongi
- Lomax and Massare described the new species Ichthyosaurus anningae
- Maxwell and others described the new genus and species Muiscasaurus catheti
- A study of phylogenetic relationships of ichthyopterygians is published by Ji et al. (2015); the authors introduced a new name, Grippioidea, for the clade containing the last common ancestor of Utatsusaurus hataii and Grippia longirostris, and all its descendants.
- An exceptionally large ichthyosaur radius, possibly belonging to a member of Shastasauridae (which, if confirmed, would indicate that members of the family survived until Early Jurassic) is described from the Hettangian Blue Lias Formation (south Wales, United Kingdom) by Martin et al. (2015).

==== 2016 ====
- Jiang and others described the new genus and species Sclerocormus parviceps.
- Lomax described the new genus and species Wahlisaurus.
- Lomax and Massare described the new species Ichthyosaurus larkini and I. somersetensis.
- Tyborowski described the new species Cryopterygius kielanae.
- A study of taxonomic richness, disparity and evolutionary rates of ichthyosaurs throughout the Cretaceous period is published by Fischer et al. (2016).
- A restudy of "Platypterygius" campylodon is published by Fischer (2016), who transfers this species to the genus Pervushovisaurus.
- A revision of the ichthyosaur material of the British Middle and Late Jurassic referable to Ophthalmosaurus icenicus is published by Moon & Kirton (2016).

==== 2017 ====
- Delsett and others described the new genus and species Keilhauia nui.
- Paparella and others described the new genus and species Gengasaurus.
- Lomax, Massare and Mistry described the new genus and species Protoichthyosaurus applebyi.
- A study on the emergence date and changes of the evolutionary rate during the ichthyosauromorph evolution is published by Motani et al. (2017).
- A jaw fragment of a member of the genus Omphalosaurus is described from the Middle Triassic (Anisian) Karchowice Formation (Poland) by Wintrich, Hagdorn & Sander (2017), representing the first record of Omphalosaurus from shallow marine carbonates and from the Muschelkalk facies.
- Description of three nearly complete and well-preserved skulls of Chaohusaurus chaoxianensis, revealing new information on the skull anatomy of the species, is published by Zhou et al. (2017).
- A specimen of Ichthyosaurus somersetensis containing an embryo, representing the largest unequivocal specimen of a member of the genus Ichthyosaurus, is described from the Lower Jurassic (lower Hettangian) Blue Lias Formation (United Kingdom) by Lomax & Sachs (2017).
- Plet et al. (2017) report the presence of red and white blood cell-like structures as well as platelet-like structures, collagen and cholesterol in a vertebra of a member of the genus Stenopterygius from Toarcian Posidonia Shale (Germany).
- An articulated skeleton of an ophthalmosaurid ichthyosaur is described from the Upper Jurassic (Kimmeridgian) Katrol Formation (India) by Prasad et al. (2017).

==== 2018 ====
- A study aiming to identify sexual dimorphism, taxonomic variation and individual variation among the specimens of Chaohusaurus chaoxianensis is published by Motani et al. (2018).
- A survey of the form and distribution of pathological structures in the skeletons of ichthyosaurs is published by Pardo-Pérez et al. (2018).
- A study on the microanatomy of vertebral centra of ichthyosaurs, aiming to establish whether there is any variation between the primitive and the most derived forms, is published by Houssaye, Nakajima & Sander (2018).
- Humeri of Pessopteryx nisseri and vertebrae referred to the genus Cymbospondylus are described from the Lower Triassic Vikinghøgda Formation (Spitsbergen, Norway) by Engelschiøn et al. (2018).
- A large, isolated jaw fragment of a giant ichthyosaur is described from the Upper Triassic (Rhaetian) Westbury Mudstone Formation (United Kingdom) by Lomax et al. (2018), who also reinterpret some putative dinosaur limb bone shafts from the Upper Triassic of Aust Cliff as more likely to be ichthyosaur fossils.
- Ichthyosaur fossils, including an incomplete skeleton of a member of the genus Leptonectes, are described from the Lower Jurassic (Pliensbachian) of Asturias (Spain) by Fernández, Piñuela & García-Ramos (2018).
- Remains of ichthyosaur embryos, still situated within a fragment of the rib-cage of the parent animal, are described from the Lower Jurassic (Toarcian) Whitby Mudstone Formation (United Kingdom) by Boyd & Lomax (2018).
- Ichthyosaur remains from the Lower Cretaceous Agrio Formation (Neuquén Basin, Argentina) are described by Lazo et al. (2018).
- New specimen of Phalarodon fraasi is described from the Middle Triassic Botneheia Formation (Svalbard, Norway) by Økland et al. (2018).
- Redescription of the relocated holotype of Suevoleviathan integer is published by Maxwell (2018), who considers the species Suevoleviathan disinteger to be a junior synonym of S. integer.
- A study on specimens of Temnodontosaurus from the Early Jurassic of southern Germany, aiming to document the types of pathologies observed in the skeletons of specimens assigned to this genus, is published by Pardo-Pérez et al. (2018).
- Four isolated partial skulls from the Lower Jurassic of the United Kingdom, previously identified as Ichthyosaurus communis, are assigned to the species Protoichthyosaurus prostaxalis and P. applebyi by Lomax & Massare (2018), providing new information on the anatomy of these taxa.
- A reassessment of Ichthyosaurus communis and I. intermedius is published by Massare & Lomax (2018), who consider the latter species to be a junior synonym of the former.
- A study on the cellular and molecular composition of integumental tissues in an exceptionally preserved specimen of Stenopterygius is published by Lindgren et al. (2018).
- New specimen of Palvennia hoybergeti, providing new information on the anatomy of this species, is described from the Upper Jurassic Slottsmøya Member of the Agardhfjellet Formation (Spitsbergen, Norway) by Delsett et al. (2018).
- A revision of British ichthyosaur taxa of the Late Jurassic is published by Moon & Kirton (2018).

==== 2019 ====
- Two new specimens of Eretmorhipis carrolldongi, revealing superficial convergence with the modern platypus, are described from the Lower Triassic Jialingjiang Formation (China) by Cheng et al. (2019).
- A study on the phylogenetic relationships of ichthyosaurs will be published by Moon (2019).
- A study on the evolution of ichthyosaur body forms and on its impact on the energy demands of ichthyosaur swimming is published by Gutarra et al. (2019).
- A study on the flexibility and function of ichthyosaur tails, as indicated by comparisons with shark tails, is published by Crofts, Shehata & Flammang (2019).
- A study on the effects of methodology, missing data and exceptional preservation of fossil specimens in lagerstätten on known morphological diversity of fossil animals, as indicated by fossil record of ichthyosaurs, is published by Flannery Sutherland et al. (2019).
- Second specimen of Wahlisaurus massarae is reported from a quarry in Somerset (United Kingdom), from the base of the Blue Lias Formation (Triassic–Jurassic boundary) by Lomax, Evans & Carpenter (2019), extending known geographic and stratigraphic range of the species.
- Partial skeleton of a large ichthyosaur from the Lower Jurassic (Sinemurian) of Warwickshire, England is described by Lomax, Porro & Larkin (2019), who assign this specimen to the species Protoichthyosaurus prostaxalis.
- A neonate specimen of Ichthyosaurus communis is described by Lomax et al. (2019).
- A study on the variation of the hindfin morphology in the specimens of Ichthyosaurus and on its taxonomic utility is published by Massare & Lomax (2019).
- A study on the bone microstructure of the skeleton of a specimen of Stenopterygius quadriscissus from the Lower Jurassic Posidonia Shale (Germany) is published by Anderson et al. (2019).
- A study on ontogentic variation in the braincase of Stenopterygius is published by Miedema and Maxwell
- A study on the anatomy of an ophthalmosaurid rostrum fragment from the Upper Jurassic (Oxfordian) in the Morawica quarry in the Świętokrzyskie Mountains (Poland), and on its implications for reconstructing the internal morphology of the ophthalmosaurid cranial region and inferring the functional adaptations and palaeoecology of these reptiles, will be published by Tyborowski, Skrzycki & Dec (2019).
- A revision of the type series of all three species of Undorosaurus is published by Zverkov & Efimov (2019).
- A study on the taxonomy and phylogeny of ichthyosaurs belonging to the genus Arthropterygius is published by Zverkov & Prilepskaya (2019).
- New fossil remains of Platypterygius sachicarum (a new skull and associated postcranial remains of upper Barremian age) are described from Villa de Leyva, Colombia by Maxwell et al. (2019), representing the first documented postcranial remains of this species.
- Campos, Fernández and Herrera described the new species Arthropterygius thalassonotus
- Huang and others described the new species Chaohusaurus brevifemoralis

==== 2020 ====
- Barrientos Lara and others described the new genus and species Acuetzpalin carranzai.

== See also ==
- History of paleontology
  - Timeline of paleontology
- Timeline of plesiosaur research
- Timeline of mosasaur research
