= Orndorff (disambiguation) =

Orndorff is a surname.

Orndorff may also refer to:

- Mount Orndorff, Antarctica
- Orendorf Site, archaeological site in Canton, Fulton County, Illinois, U.S.

== See also ==
- Orndoff (disambiguation)
