= Orndoff =

Orndoff may refer to:

== Places ==
- Orndoff, West Virginia, an unincorporated community in Webster County
- Orndoff-Cross House, a historic home in West Virginia

== People with the surname ==
- Harry Westley Orndoff
- Scott Orndoff, American football player

== See also ==
- Orndorff (disambiguation)
