= Orndorff =

Orndorff is a German language locational surname, which is a variant of Orendorff. It originally meant a person from the village of Ohrdruf or Ohrdorf in Germany. Notable people with the names include:

- Alfred Orendorff (1845–1909), American politician
- George Orendorff (1906–1984), American jazz trumpeter.
- Jess Orndorff (1881–1960), American baseball player
- Paul Orndorff (1949–2021), American professional wrestler

== See also ==
- Ohlendorf, surname
- Orndoff (disambiguation), includes list of people with the surname Orndoff
