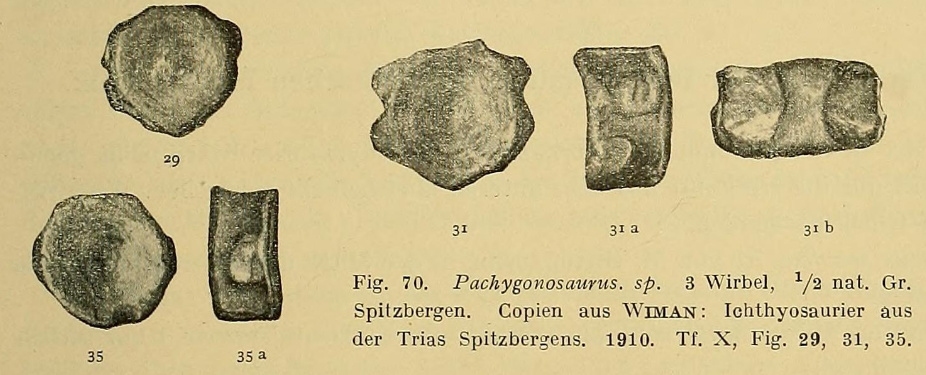
- Vertebrae of Pachygonosaurus sp.

Scientific classification
- Domain: Eukaryota
- Kingdom: Animalia
- Phylum: Chordata
- Class: Reptilia
- Order: †Ichthyosauria
- Genus: †Pachygonosaurus von Huene, 1916

Type species
- †Pachygonosaurus robustus Maisch and Matzke, 1997

= Pachygonosaurus =

Pachygonosaurus Temporal range: Ladinian, 242–237 Ma

Extinct genus of reptiles

Pachygonosaurus (meaning "wide angled [vertebrae] lizard") is a genus of ichthyosaur from Upper Silesia, Poland (then part of the German Empire). It was described in 1916 by Friedrich von Huene and it has one single species, Pachygonosaurus robustus, based solely on the holotype, composed of two vertebral centra discovered in 1910, with a further three vertebrae also possibly belonging to the genus. Nowadays, Pachygonosaurus is considered a nomen dubium.

== See also ==
- Timeline of ichthyosaur research
