= Matzke =

Matzke is a surname. Notable people with the surname include:

- Gerald Matzke (1931–2024), American politician from Nebraska
- Nick Matzke (fl. 2005), American science writer
