= Ohlendorf =

Ohlendorf is a German surname. Notable people with the surname include:

- Otto Ohlendorf (1907–1951), German SS general and Holocaust perpetrator, executed for war crimes
- Ross Ohlendorf (born 1982), American baseball pitcher
