= Manabe =

Manabe (written: 真鍋, 眞鍋 or 間部) is a Japanese surname. Notable people with the surname include:

- Manabe Akifusa (間部 詮房, 1666–1720), Japanese daimyō
- Manabe Akikatsu (間部 詮勝, 1804–1884), Japanese daimyō
- Johji Manabe (真鍋 譲治, born 1964), Japanese manga artist
- Kaori Manabe (眞鍋 かをり, born 1980), Japanese television personality and model
- Kazushito Manabe (真鍋 和人, born 1958), Japanese weightlifter
- Keiko Manabe (真鍋 敬子, born 1987), Japanese field hockey player
- Masayoshi Manabe (真鍋 政義, born 1963), Japanese volleyball player
- Riichiro Manabe (真鍋 理一郎, 1924–2015), Japanese composer
- Syukuro Manabe (真鍋 淑郎, born 1931), Japanese meteorologist and climatologist
- Takeki Manabe (真鍋 武紀, born 1940), Japanese politician
- Yoshiaki Manabe (真鍋 吉明, born 1962), Japanese rock guitarist

== See also ==
- 6193 Manabe, a main-belt asteroid
