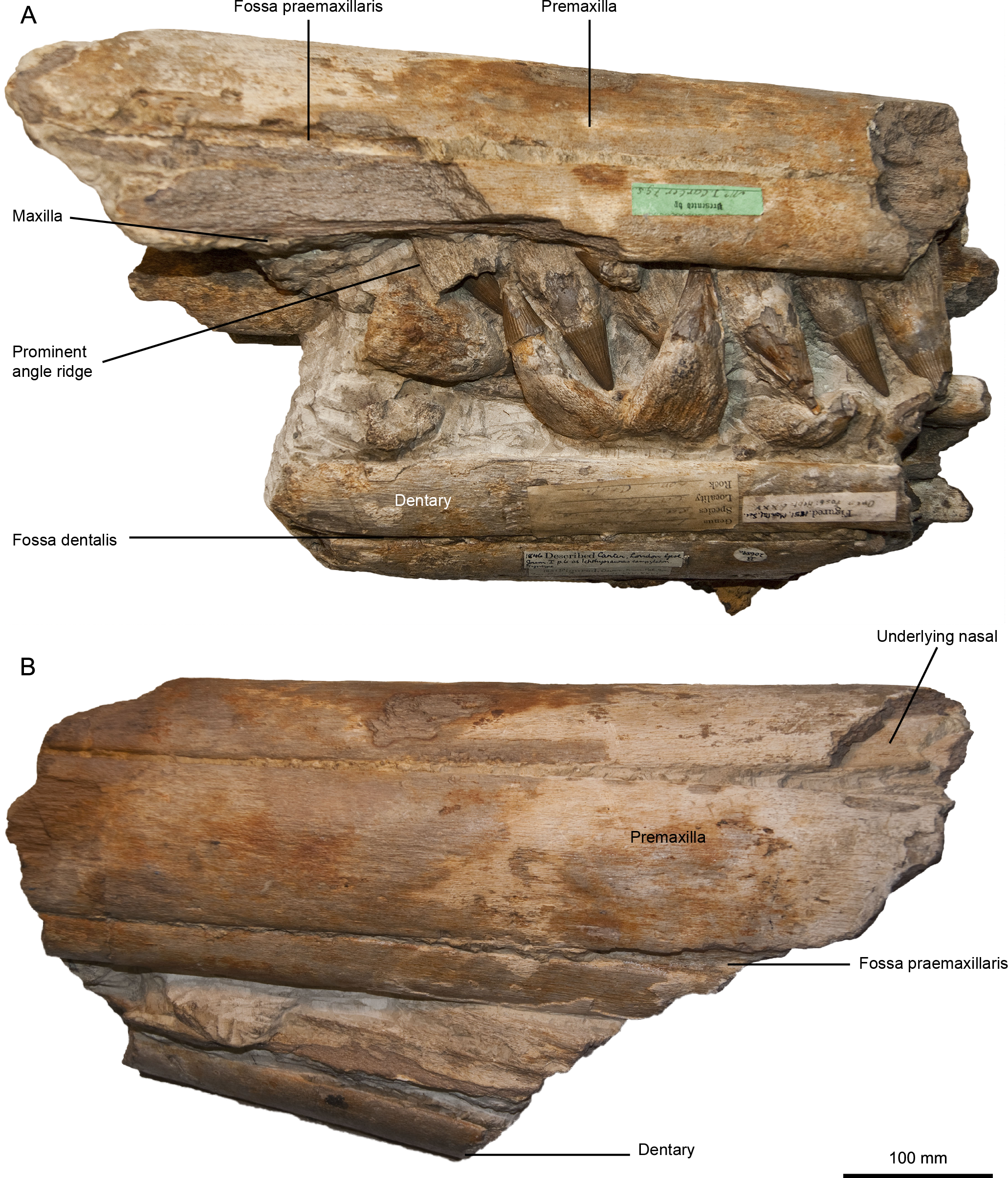
- P. campylodon snout fragment, the lectotype specimen of the species

Scientific classification
- Kingdom: Animalia
- Phylum: Chordata
- Class: Reptilia
- Order: †Ichthyosauria
- Family: †Ophthalmosauridae
- Subfamily: †Platypterygiinae
- Genus: †Pervushovisaurus; Arkhangelsky, 1998

Species
- †P. bannovkensis Arkhangelsky, 1998 (Type); †P. campylodon (Carter, 1846)

Synonyms
- Ichthyosaurus campylodon Carter, 1846; Platypterygius kiprijanoffi Romer, 1968

= Pervushovisaurus =

Pervushovisaurus Temporal range: Cenomanian 100.5–93.9 Ma

Extinct genus of reptiles

Pervushovisaurus is a genus of platypterygiine ichthyosaur from the Upper Cretaceous (Cenomanian) Melovatka Formation in the Saratov region in western Russia, the La Penthiève Beds of France and the Cambridge area of the United Kingdom.

== History ==
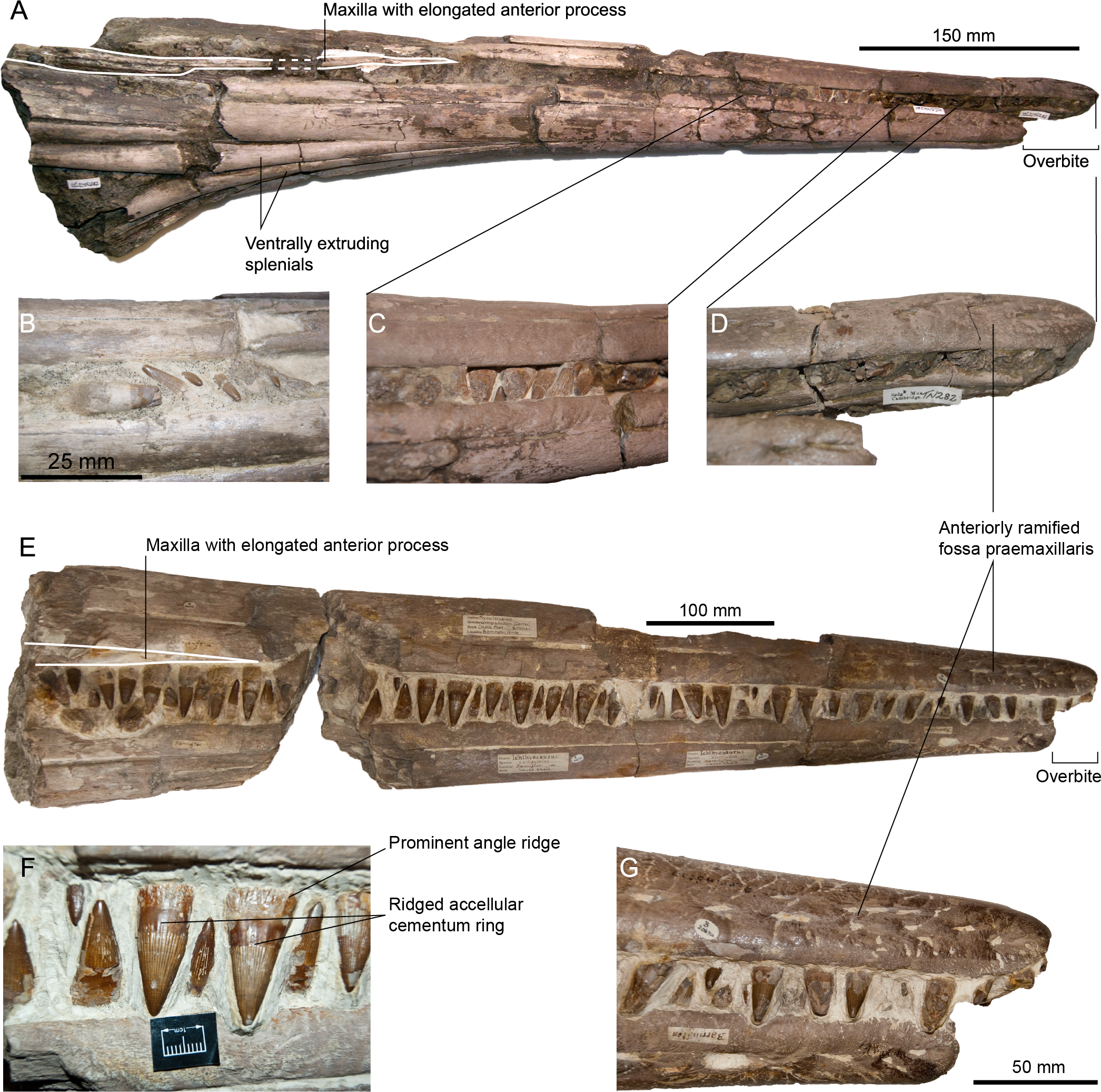
Rostra assigned to P. campylodon

It was originally described as a subgenus of Platypterygius, but later work showed that it was sufficiently distinct from the type species of Platypterygius, P. platydactylus, to be elevated to full generic rank. The type species of Pervushovisaurus, P. bannovkensis, is known only from the holotype, SSU 104a/24, a partial skull. In 2016, an additional species of Platypterygius from England and France, P. campylodon, was also referred to Pervushovisaurus after previously being allied with Ichthyosaurus in 1846. A previous Russian species of Platypterygius, "P." kiprianoffi, was also assigned to P. campylodon.

A specimen of P. campylodon was found in the La Penthiève Beds of France and was described in 1882 by Henri Émile Sauvage.

== Description ==
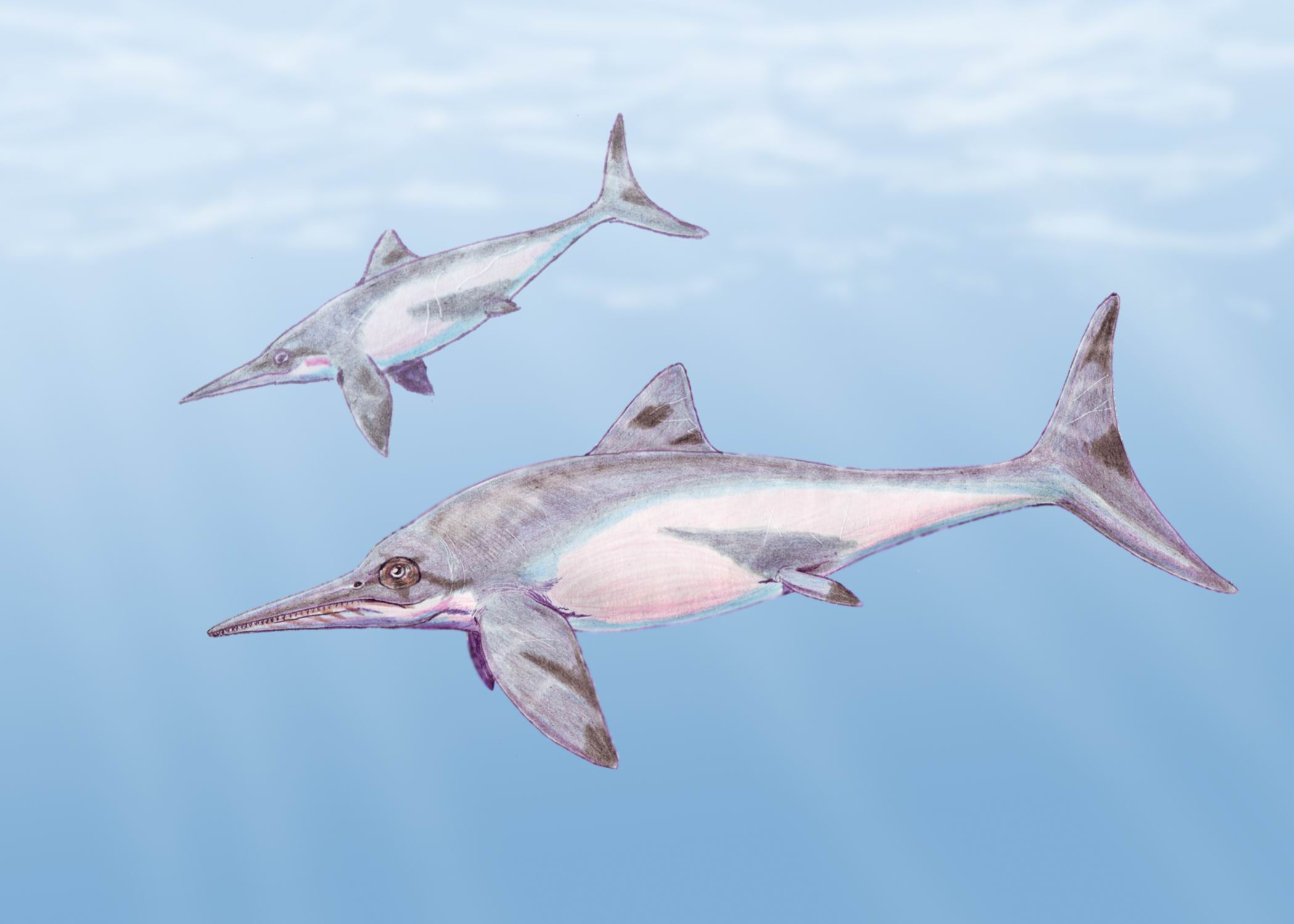
Life restoration of P. campylodon

Pervushovisaurus was a medium-sized ichthyosaur measuring 5.8 metres (19 ft) long. Fishcer (2016) gave the emended diagnosis of Pervushovisaurus as follows, based on that of Fischer et al. (2014): "Platypterygiine ophthalmosaurid characterized by the following autapomorphies [...]: presence of foramina along the ventral premaxillary–maxillary suture; presence of a semi-oval foramen on the lateral surface of the premaxilla, anteroventral to the external naris; presence of lateral ridges on the maxilla; presence of wide supranarial 'wing' of the nasal (a similar structure, although much smaller, is present in 'Platypterygius' australis and Acamptonectes densus) (see Kear, 2005; Fischer et al., 2012, respectively); robust splenial markedly protruding from the external surface of the mandible; root with quadrangular cross-section, with the cementum forming prominent 90° angles.

Pervushovisaurus is also characterized by the following unique combination of features: secondarily closed naris surrounded by foramina (as in 'Platypterygius' sachicarum and 'Platypterygius' australis (see Paramo, 1997; Kear, 2005, respectively), and in Simbirskiasaurus birjukovi, although the 'anterior' naris is still present in this taxon (Maisch & Matzke, 2000; Fischer et al., 2014a)); elongated anterior process of the maxilla, reaching anteriorly the level of the nasal (unlike in Aegirosaurus leptospondylus, Sveltonectes insolitus and Muiscasaurus catheti) (Bardet & Fernández, 2000; Fischer et al., 2011a; Maxwell et al., 2015, respectively); rostrum straight (unlike in 'Platypterygius' americanus, 'Platypterygius' sachicarum, 'Platypterygius' australis and possibly Muiscasaurus catheti, where it is slightly curved anteroventrally Romer, 1968; Paramo, 1997; Kear, 2005; Maxwell et al., 2015, respectively); straight, non-recurved tooth crowns (unlike in Sveltonectes insolitus, Muiscasaurus catheti) (Fischer et al., 2011a; Maxwell et al., 2015, respectively)."
