= Zapata Formation =

Geological formation in Chile and Argentina

- Stratigraphic range: Berriasian-Hauterivian
- Type: Geological formation
- Underlies: Punta Barrosa & Erezcano Formations
- Overlies: Tobífera & Springhill Formations

Lithology
- Primary: Shale
- Other: Turbiditic sandstone, pyrite

Location
- Coordinates: 51.1°S 73.3°W
- Approximate paleocoordinates: 51.3°S 36.9°W
- Region: Magallanes y la Antártica Chilena & Aysén Regions; Santa Cruz Province
- Country: Chile, Argentina
- Extent: Magallanes or Austral Basin

Type section
- Named for: Cerro Zapata
- Zapata Formation (Argentina)

Zapata Formation (Spanish: Formación Zapata) is a sedimentary formation of Lower Cretaceous age in the Magallanes or Austral Basin of Argentina and Chile. Much of the formation is folded and faulted as consequence of the Andean orogeny. In outcrops of the Zapata Formation near Torres del Paine, the ichthyosaur genus Myobradypterygius has been found.

== Fossil content ==
Color key: Taxon / Reclassified taxon / Taxon falsely reported as present / Dubious taxon or junior synonym / Ichnotaxon / Ootaxon / Morphotaxon	Notes; Uncertain or tentative taxa are in small text; ~~crossed out~~ taxa are discredited.

=== Ichthyosaurs ===
Ichthyosaurs of the Zapata Formation
Genus	Species	Location	Stratigraphic position	Material	Notes	Images
Myobradypterygius	M. hauthali				A ophthalmosaurid ichthyosaur	
