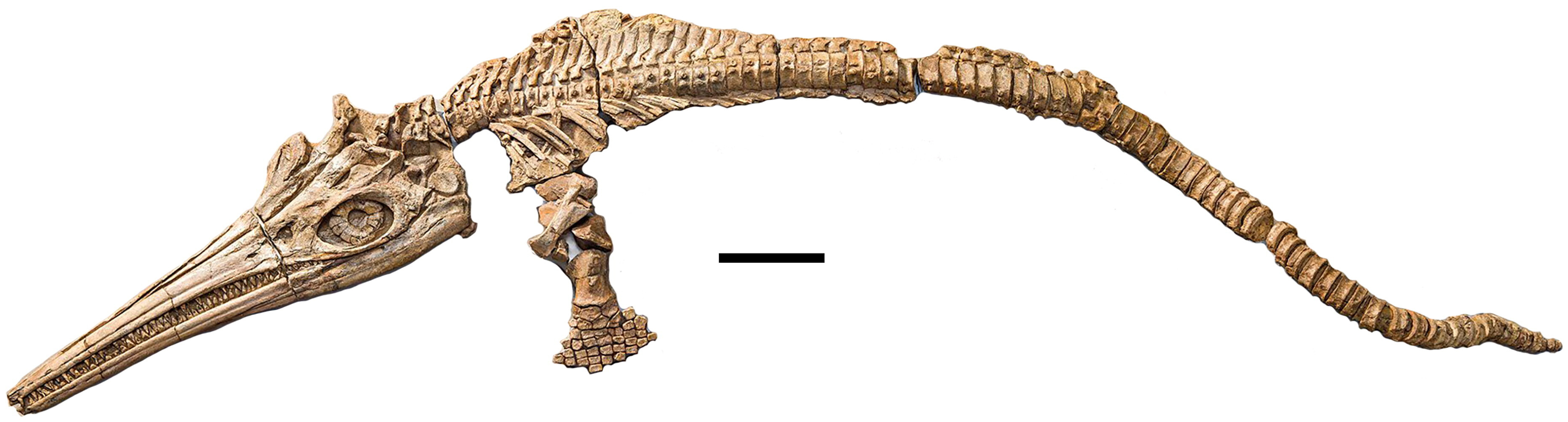
- Assigned P. australis specimen

Scientific classification
- Kingdom: Animalia
- Phylum: Chordata
- Class: Reptilia
- Order: †Ichthyosauria
- Family: †Ophthalmosauridae
- Subfamily: †Platypterygiinae
- Genus: †Platypterygius von Huene, 1922

Type species
- †Platypterygius platydactylus (Broili, 1907)

Other species
- †P. americanus (Nace, 1939); †P. australis (McCoy, 1867); †P. hercynicus Kuhn, 1946; †P. elsuntuoso Fonseca, Cabra, & Camacho, 2024

Synonyms
- Ichthyosaurus platydactylus Broili, 1907; Longirostria australis McCoy, 1867; Myobradypterygius mollensis Rusconi, 1938; Platypterygius longmani Wade, 1990; Tenuirostria americanus Hace, 1939

= Platypterygius =

Platypterygius Temporal range: Late Aptian-Late Cenomanian 113–93.9 Ma

Extinct genus of reptiles

Platypterygius (meaning "flat fin") is a historically paraphyletic genus of platypterygiine ichthyosaur from the Cretaceous period. It was historically used as a wastebasket taxon, and most species within Platypterygius likely are undiagnostic at the genus or species level, or represent distinct genera, even being argued as invalid. While fossils referred to Platypterygius have been found throughout different continents, the holotype specimen was found in Germany.

== Description ==
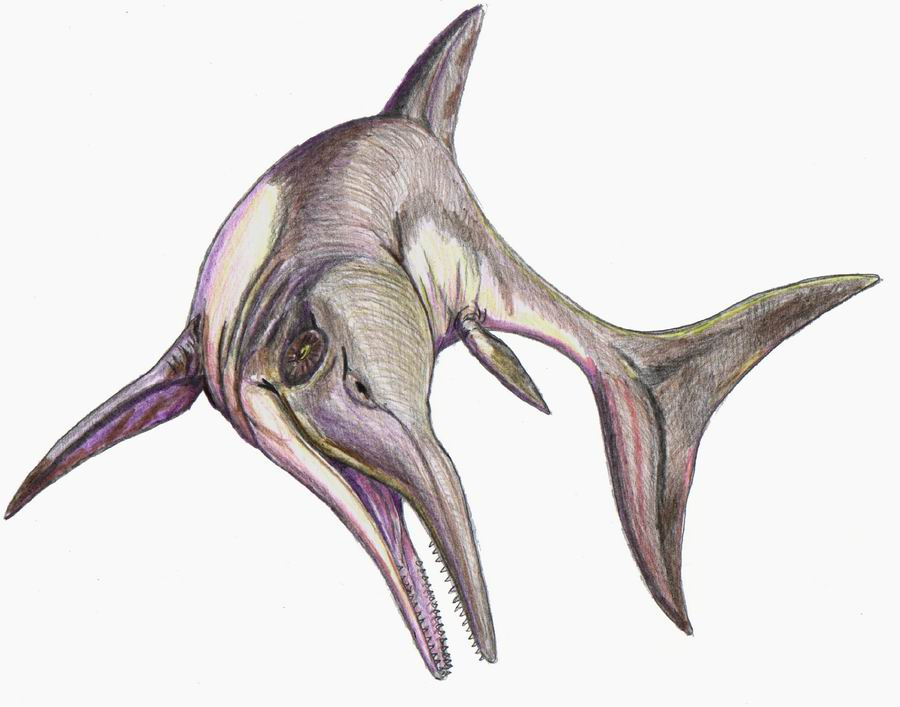
Restoration of P. australis

As Platypterygius contains multiple species not especially close to each other, little can be said in terms of shared characteristics. According to an analysis by Fischer (2012), all anatomical features used to unify Platypterygius species are either not actually present in each species, or much more widespread among unrelated ophthalmosaurs. Generally, species referred to this genus were large bodied macropredators based on their robust dentition. This is also supported by P. australis having been found with remains of hatchling protostegid sea turtles and enantiornithines (possibly Nanantius) in association with actinopterygian fish in its guts.

In 1998, Arkhangelsky estimated that P. platydactylus was about 5 metres (16 ft) long, while "P." americanus was about 5.5 metres (18 ft) long. In 2010, Zammit and colleagues estimated that "P." australis was about 7 metres (23 ft) long.

== Discovery and species ==
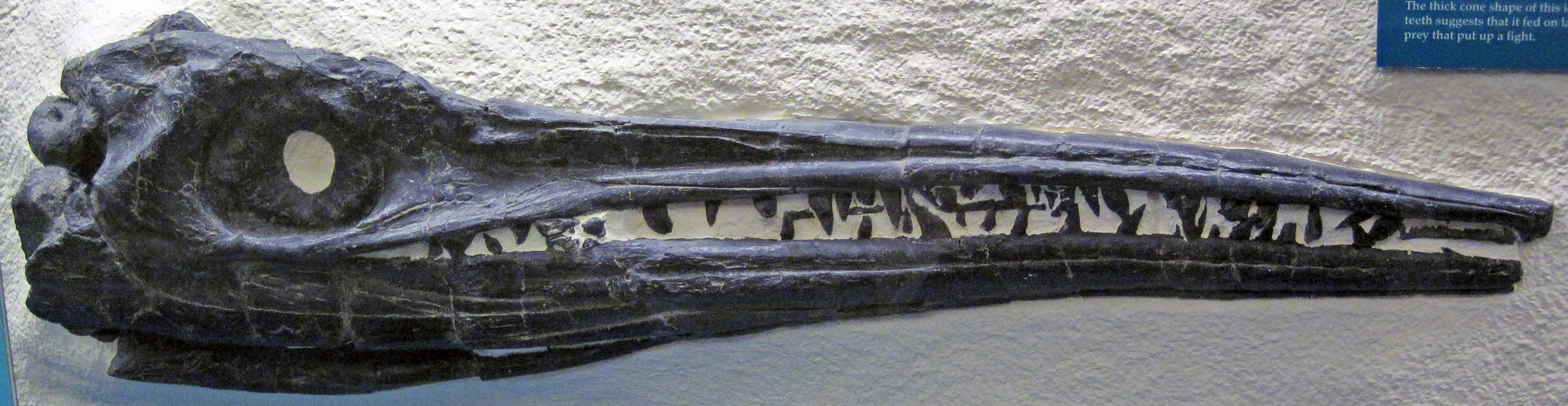
Skull of P. sp., Sternberg Museum of Natural History

The type species of Platypterygius was described in 1922 based on remains found in upper Aptian strata around Hannover, Germany that were previously described as a species of Ichthyosaurus (I. platydactylus) in 1907 by Ferdinand Broili. These remains however were not adequately described and to complicate matters further, destroyed during World War 2. In the time after its discovery however Platypterygius has become a catch-all genus for Cretaceous ichthyosaurs, creating the misconstrued view of post-Jurassic ichthyosaurs as being a single global genus lacking in diversity. Later research conducted in the 2000s and 2010s has repeatedly shown this to be false, with all of the autapomorphies previously used to define Platypterygius either not being present in all assigned species or also being present in other ophthalmosaurids. As the holotype was destroyed, a redescription of the material attempting to identify valid autapomorphies is out of the question and leaves the genus in a problematic state. Furthermore, the inclusion of later described genera of Cretaceous, platypterygiine ichthyosaurs has shown Platypterygius to be paraphyletic, with the different species not clading closely to one another. Subsequently, many redescriptions of referred Platypterygius species have found them to be their own distinct genera.

One notable attempt at revising Platypterygius was conducted by Arkhangel'sky in 1998, who split the genus into three new subgenera. Longirostria (including the Australian "P." longmani, a synonym of "P." australis, and the Argentinian "P." hauthali), Tenuirostria ("P." americanus) and Pervushovisaurus (which included the newly described "P." bannovkensis). Both Platypterygius platydactylus,"P." kiprianoffi and "P." hercynicus were placed in the subgenus Platypterygius.

"Platypterygius" bannovkensis was eventually elevated to its own genus Pervushovisaurus in 2014, utilizing Arkhangel'sky's proposed subgenus name and "P." campylodon was also assigned to this genus by a study published in 2016. "P." kiprianoffi was also assigned to P. campylodon (now Pervushovisaurus). Simbirskiasaurus was originally described in 1985 and later sunk into Platypterygius before being declared distinct in the same paper as Pervushovisaurus. "Platypterygius" ochevi, described in 2008 by Arkhangel'sky et al., was found to be a junior synonym of Maiaspondylus cantabrigiensis and in 2021 "Platypterygius" sachicarum was described by Cortés et al. as Kyhytysuka sachicarum. It is argued that the inclusion of oldest species "P." hauthali requires reinvestigation, for it lacks a skull to attribute. Because of this, recent analyses on ichthyosaur classification neglect this species. In 2024, "P." hauthali was reclassified back into the original genus, Myobradypterygius.

=== Accepted species ===
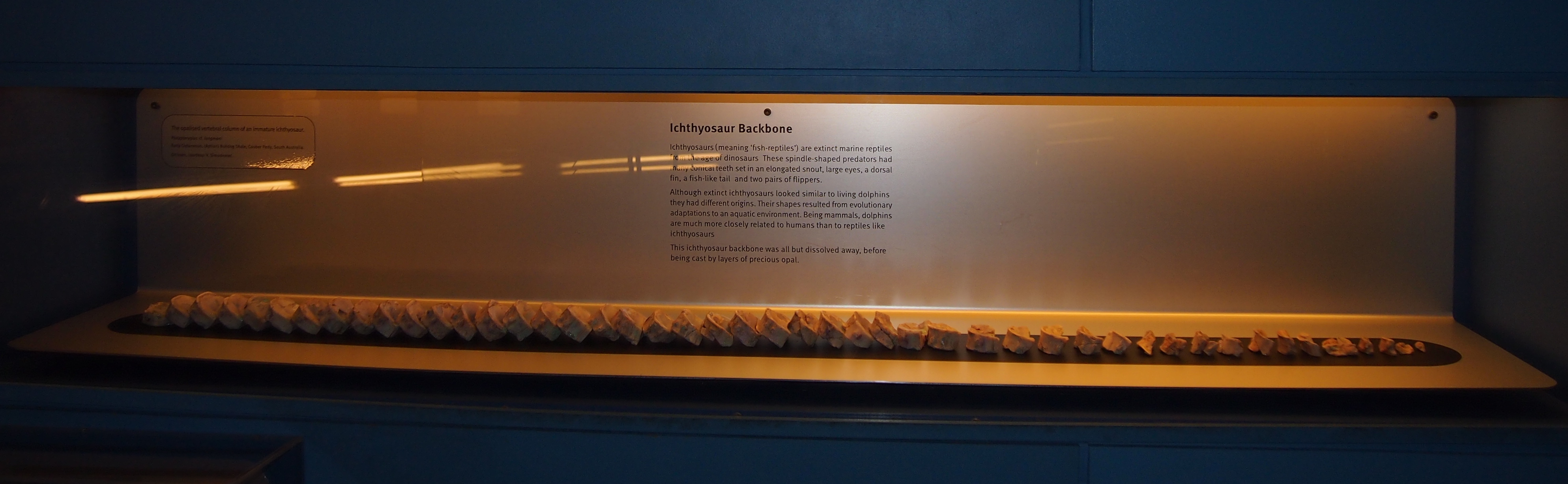
Opalized vertebral column assigned to an immature P. cf. longmani (a synonym of P. australis)

- Platypterygius platydactylus Broilli, 1907 (type)
- Platypterygius americanus Nace, 1939 (=Tenuirostria)
- Platypterygius australis McCoy, 1867 (=Longirostria)
- Platypterygius hercynicus Kuhn, 1946
- Platypterygius elsuntuoso Fonseca, Cabra, & Camacho, 2024

=== Formerly assigned species ===
- Pervushovisaurus bannovkensis Arkhangelsky, 1998
- Pervushovisaurus campylodon Carter, 1846
- Simbirskiasaurus birjukovi Otschev and Efimov, 1985
- Plutoniosaurus bedengensis Efimov, 1997
- Maiaspondylus cantabrigiensis (senior synonym of Platypterygius ochevi Arkhangelsky et al., 2008)
- Kyhytysuka sachicarum Cortés et al., 2021 (formerly Platypterygius sachicarum Páramo, 1997)
- Myobradypterygius hauthali von Huene, 1927

== Classification ==
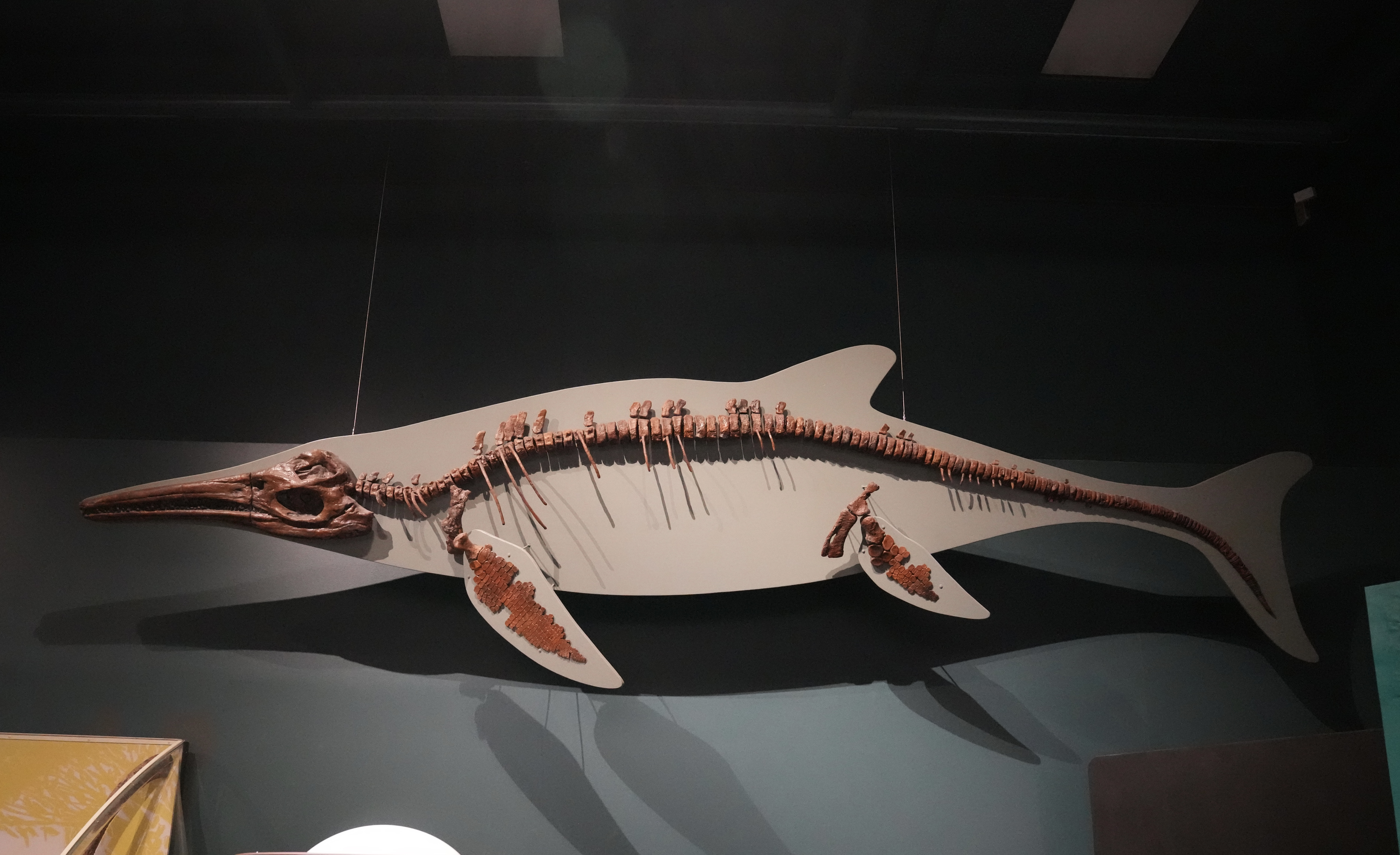
Skeleton of P. australis in Museum and Art Gallery of the Northern Territory

The following cladogram shows the internal relationships of ophthalmosaurian ichthyosaurs according to an analysis performed by Zverkov and Jacobs (2020) which shows that P. americanus is too distantly related compared to the other three species.

- Ophthalmosauria
  - - Ophthalmosaurinae
      - - - - Acamptonectes densus
            - - Mollesaurus periallus
              - - Ophthalmosaurus natans
                - Ophthalmosaurus icenicus
      - - - Gengasaurus nicosiai
          - - - Nannopterygius yasykovi
              - - Nannopterygius enthekiodon
                - Nannopterygius saveljeviensis
                - Nannopterygius borealis
            - - - Arthropterygius volgensis
                - - Arthropterygius lundi
                  - Arthropterygius thalassonotus
                  - - Arthropterygius hoybergeti
                    - Arthropterygius chrisorum
    - Platypterygiinae
      - - Brachypterygius extremus
        - Aegirosaurus leptospondylus
        - - Muiscasaurus catheti
          - - Leninia stellans
            - - Sveltonectes insolitus
              - - Athabascasaurus bitumineus
                - - Platypterygius americanus
                  - - - Acuetzpalin carranzai
                      - Platypterygius sachicarum
                      - Caypullisaurus bonapartei
                    - - - - Grendelius mordax
                          - Grendelius alekseevi
                          - Grendelius pseudoscythicus
                          - Grendelius zhuravlevi
                        - - - - Undorosaurus kielanae
                              - - Undorosaurus nessovi
                                - Undorosaurus gorodischensis
                      - - Platypterygius australis
                        - - Plutoniosaurus bedengensis
                          - Simbirskiasaurus birjukovi
                          - Platypterygius hercynicus
                          - Sisteronia seeleyi
                          - Platypterygius platydactylus
                          - Maiaspondylus lindoei

== See also ==
- List of ichthyosaurs
- Timeline of ichthyosaur research
