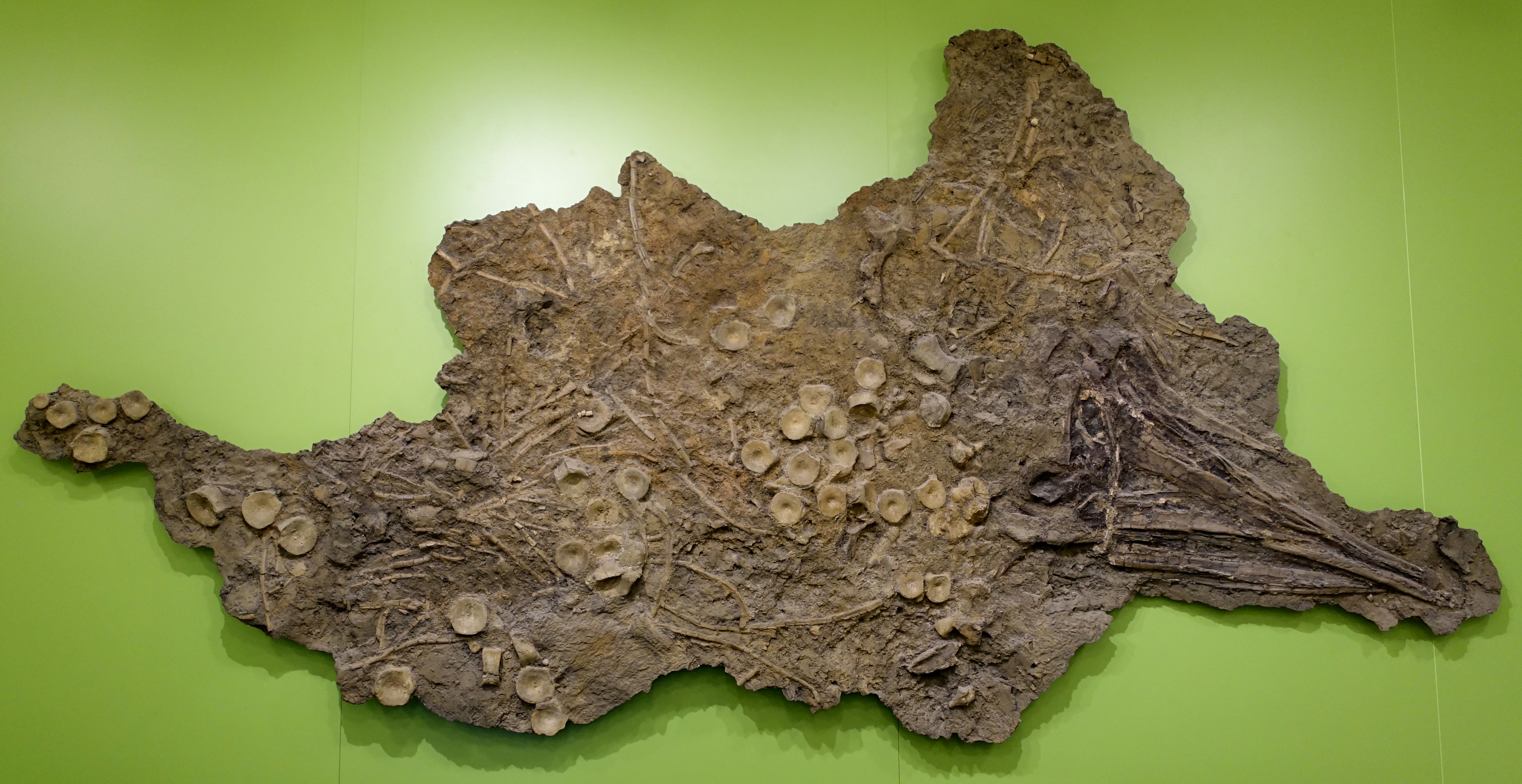
- Specimen SNHM1284-R in State Natural History Museum, Braunschweig

Scientific classification
- Kingdom: Animalia
- Phylum: Chordata
- Class: Reptilia
- Order: †Ichthyosauria
- Family: †Ophthalmosauridae
- Subfamily: †Ophthalmosaurinae
- Genus: †Acamptonectes; Fischer et al., 2012
- Species: †A. densus

Binomial name
- †Acamptonectes densus Fischer et al., 2012

= Acamptonectes =

Acamptonectes Temporal range: Hauterivian ~133–129 Ma

Extinct genus of ophthalmosaurid ichthyosaur known from England and Germany

Acamptonectes is a genus of ichthyosaurs, a type of dolphin-like marine reptiles, that lived during the Early Cretaceous around 130 million years ago. The first specimen, a partial adult skeleton, was discovered in Speeton, England, in 1958, but was not formally described until 2012 by Valentin Fischer and colleagues. They also recognised a partial subadult skeleton belonging to the genus from Cremlingen, Germany, and specimens from other localities in England. The genus contains the single species Acamptonectes densus; the generic name means "rigid swimmer" and the specific name means "compact" or "tightly packed".

A small ichthyosaur, Acamptonectes is estimated to have been 3 metres (9.8 ft) long. The generic name refers to unusual adaptations in the body of Acamptonectes that made its trunk rigid, including tightly fitting bones in the occiput (back and lower part of the skull) and interlocking vertebral centra ("bodies" of the vertebrae), which were likely adaptations that enabled it to swim at high speeds with a tuna-like form of locomotion. Other distinguishing characteristics include an extremely slender snout and unique ridges on the basioccipital bone of the braincase. As an ichthyosaur, Acamptonectes had large eye sockets and a tail fluke. Acamptonectes was similar in morphology to the related but earlier fellow ophthalmosaurines Ophthalmosaurus and Mollesaurus.

The discovery of Acamptonectes had significant implications for the evolutionary history of ichthyosaurs. The generalised platypterygiine ophthalmosaurids were long believed to be the only lineage of ichthyosaurs that survived into the Early Cretaceous following a mass extinction of ichthyosaurs across the Jurassic–Cretaceous boundary. As one of the first-known ophthalmosaurine ophthalmosaurids from the Early Cretaceous, the discovery of Acamptonectes provided evidence against such a mass extinction. Although the larger eyes of Acamptonectes would have made it better adapted than platypterygiines to depth diving, it was probably a generalist predator. Its teeth, which were slender and textured with longitudinal ridges, were adapted for impaling prey, which suggests it likely fed on soft, fleshy prey such as fish and squid.

== History of discovery ==
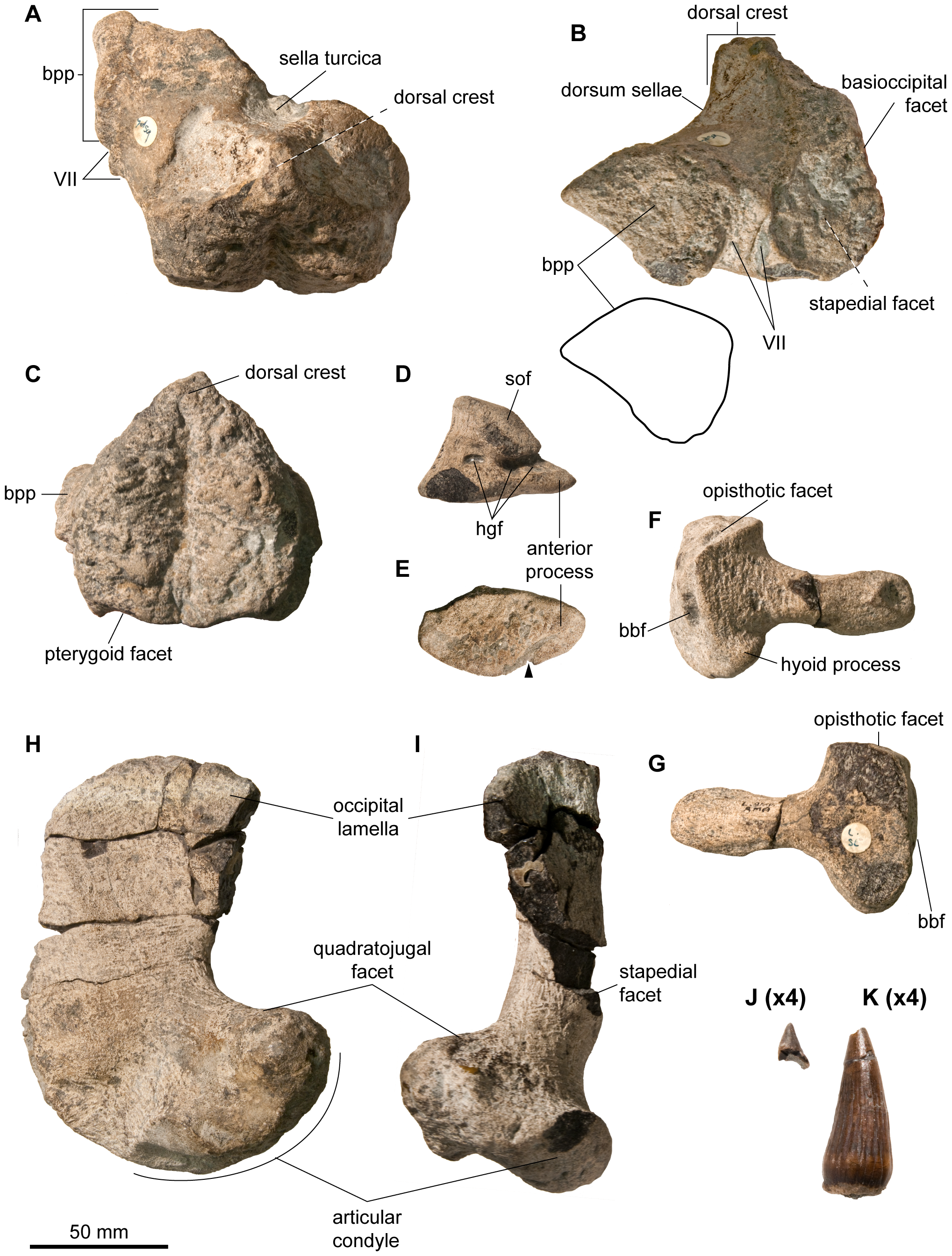
Basicranium (A–E), stapes (F–G), and teeth (J–K) of the holotype: The scientific name partially refers to the tightly fitting bones of the occiput; the arrow by the exoccipital (E) shows a notch that would closely fit a bump on the basioccipital.

Over a series of weekends in 1958, four students and a technician from Hull University's geology department collected a fossil specimen from the Speeton Clay Formation at Speeton in northern England. The fossil belonged to an ichthyosaur or "fish lizard", a Mesozoic group of marine reptiles; it consists of a partial adult skeleton that includes a fragmentary skull roof, a mandible, vertebrae, ribs, and the scapular girdle (the shoulder area). In 1991, it was transferred to the Hunterian Museum of the University of Glasgow (GLAHM) when the geology department of Hull University was closed. It was catalogued under the specimen number GLAHM 132855, and was also known as the "Speeton Clay ichthyosaur". Palaeontologist Robert M. Appleby described the specimen and assigned it to the genus Platypterygius as the species "P. speetoni" (which he considered primitive within that genus), in a monograph that remained unpublished at the time of his death in 2003. A second specimen of the species was found in 1985, also in the Speeton Clay, and is catalogued as NHMUK R11185 at the Natural History Museum, London (NHMUK). This specimen consists of a partial rostrum (snout) and mandible, fragmentary ribs, and a complete right humerus (upper-arm bone).

Palaeontologist Jeff Liston recognised the significance of the Speeton Clay ichthyosaur while working at the Hunterian Museum, and Appleby's widow Valerie asked him to help finish Appleby's unpublished monograph. Liston approached ichthyosaur specialist Valentin Fischer about writing a description of the animal. Fischer examined the specimen in 2011 and realised it represented the same ichthyosaur as a specimen from Cremlingen in northern Germany about which he had recently written a draft paper with several colleagues. This German specimen was discovered in 2005 when private fossil collector Hans-Dieter Macht found some vertebrae in a construction area. Macht notified the director of the State Natural History Museum of Braunschweig (SNHM), whereafter excavation began; the specimen was collected within three days because construction work had to continue. It was prepared and mounted in 2005 at the museum, where it is catalogued as SNHM1284-R. It consists of a partial skeleton of a subadult and includes a fragmentary skull roof, a complete mandible, a partial axial skeleton, and a partial scapular girdle. It was assigned to the genus Platypterygius in a 2008 article.

Historically, the genus Platypterygius has been treated as a catch-all wastebasket taxon for Cretaceous ichthyosaurs which contained multiple distantly-related species. Liston and Fischer recognised the specimens were distinct from other species referred to Platypterygius and belonged to a new species and genus. After determining the Speeton Clay specimen is much larger than the Cremlingen specimen and thus likely more mature, Liston and Fischer decided to make it the holotype of the new species because juvenile specimens often have characteristics absent in adults. The Cremlingen specimen and the other Speeton Clay specimen became paratypes (additional specimens in the series of type specimens). In 2012, a team of palaeontologists led by Fischer formally named the new genus and species Acamptonectes densus. The generic name is derived from the Greek words akamptos and nektes, which together mean "rigid swimmer"; the specific name means "compact" or "tightly packed". In full, the scientific name refers to the robust, tightly fitting bones of the occiput (back and lower part of the skull) and the tightly interlocking centra ("bodies") of the cervical (neck) and dorsal (back) vertebrae. The holotype, GLAHM 132855, was listed under the incorrect specimen number GLAHM 132588 in the original version of the description.

Basioccipital and basisphenoid from the Cambridge Greensand Formation that were assigned to Acamptonectes sp. in 2012, but were considered indeterminate ophthalmosaurines in 2014

Multiple basioccipitals (a bone at the lower part of the occiput), stapes (one of the ear bones), and a basisphenoid (a bone within the lower part of the braincase) from the Cambridge Greensand Formation of Cambridge, England, were also assigned to Acamptonectes sp. (i.e., an uncertain species within the genus Acamptonectes) by Fischer and colleagues in 2012. This assumed that Acamptonectes was the only Cretaceous ichthyosaur of the subfamily Ophthalmosaurinae from Eurasia. Some of the specimens are housed at the Sedgwick Museum of Earth Sciences, University of Cambridge (CAMSM), and several others are housed at the Hunterian Museum and the Natural History Museum. Several of the bones are essentially identical to those of A. densus, while others differ in some details. The bones are generally small so their differences from A. densus were considered to be related to either the ages of the animals or evolutionary changes. In 2014, Fischer and colleagues identified a basioccipital and humerus belonging to Ophthalmosaurus (or a closely related ichthyosaur) from Berriasian-aged rocks (dating to between 145 and 139.8 million years old) near Nettleton, Lincolnshire. Therefore, since their prior assumption no longer held, Fischer and colleagues re-listed the Cambridge Greensand specimens as belonging to indeterminate ophthalmosaurines that are not identifiable below the subfamily level.

Additional Acamptonectes remains known may also include an ichthyosaur specimen from Hannover, Germany. In 1909, German palaeontologist Ferdinand Broili named it as a new species of the genus Ichthyosaurus, Ichthyosaurus brunsvicensis, but considered its assignment to the genus tentative. Broili's specimen consisted of an incomplete basicranium (skull base) and an incomplete interclavicle (a bone between the clavicles, or collar bones); however, the specimen was destroyed during World War II. Palaeontologist Christopher McGowan regarded it as a member of Platypterygius in 1972 and 2003 but Fischer and colleagues assigned it to cf. Acamptonectes (i.e., possibly Acamptonectes or a related animal). They found it similar in several features to Acamptonectes but also different in others; they suggested the specimen was a juvenile because of the size and shape of its basicranium. Due to its fragmentary and inaccessible nature, they considered I. brunsvicensis a nomen dubium (dubious name).

== Description ==
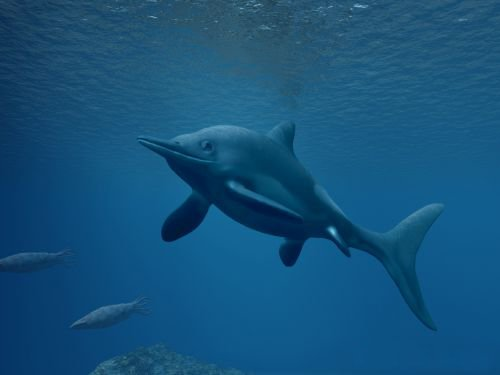
Life restoration

Acamptonectes was a small ichthyosaur, with an estimated body length of 3 metres (9.8 ft). Like other ichthyosaurs, it had a long, thin snout, large eye sockets, and a tail fluke that was supported by vertebrae in the lower half. Ichthyosaurs were superficially similar to dolphins and had flippers rather than legs, and most (except for early species) had dorsal fins. Although the colour of Acamptonectes is unknown, at least some ichthyosaurs may have been uniformly dark-coloured in life, which is evidenced by the discovery of high concentrations of eumelanin pigments in the preserved skin of an early ichthyosaur fossil.

Acamptonectes was similar in morphology to the related but earlier ophthalmosaurines Ophthalmosaurus and Mollesaurus. Features of the humerus in specimen SNHM1284-R are indicative of its immaturity; however, the humerus lacks the sandpaper-like texture of the humeral shafts (shafts of the upper arm bones) of juvenile ichthyosaurs and is thus thought to represent a subadult. The holotype and specimen NHMUK R11185 are large compared to other members of the wider family Ophthalmosauridae; the holotype is thought to have been an adult because of the extensive fusion of its bones, including within the occiput, and the smooth texture of the humerus.

=== Skull ===
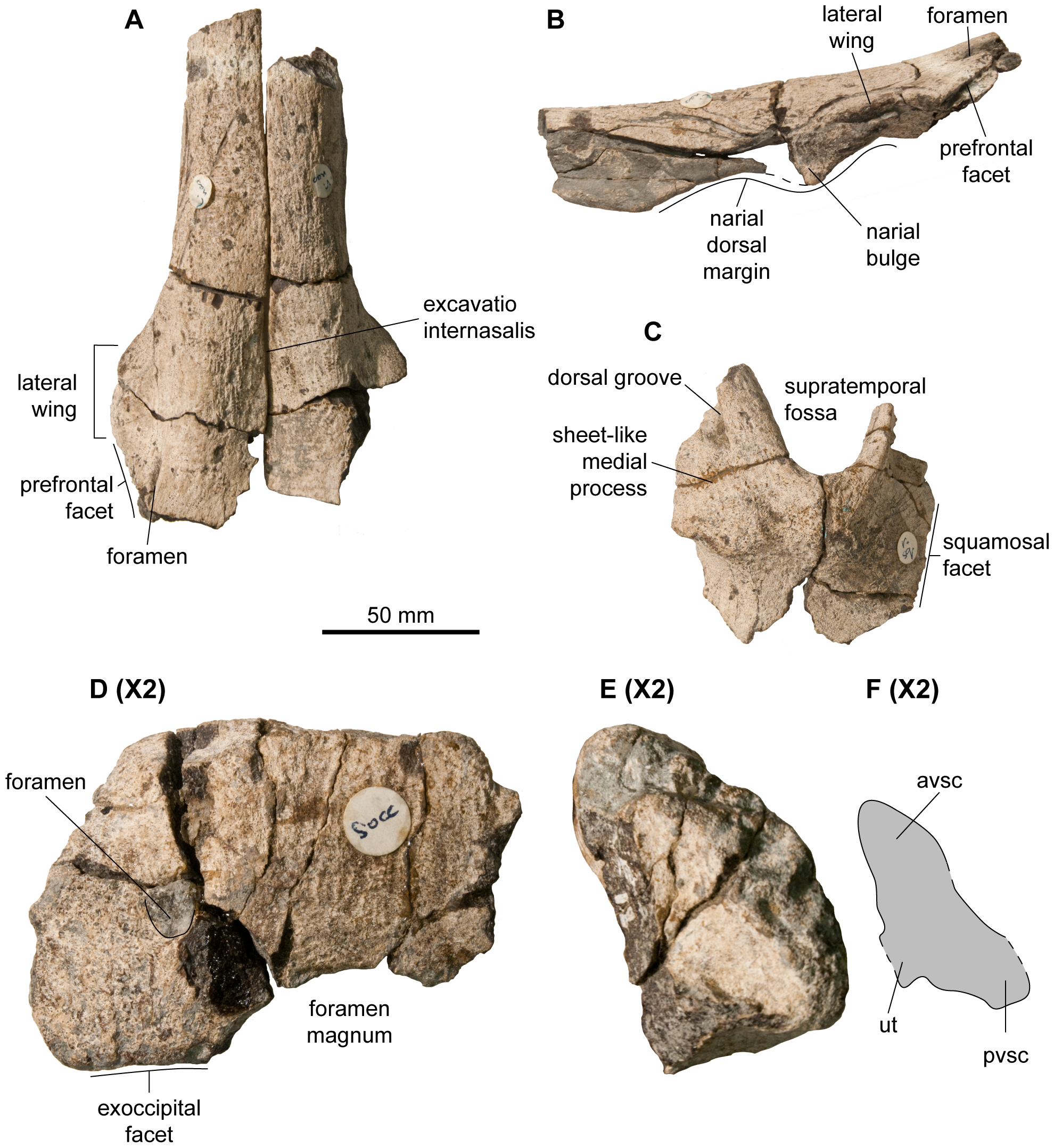
Nasal bones (A–B), supratemporal (C), and supraoccipital (D–F) of the holotype

The snout of Acamptonectes was elongated and extremely slender; in the holotype, it is only 45 mm (1.8 in) wide in front of the bony nostrils. The snout was also only 0.044 times as deep as it was long, one of the lowest ratios among ophthalmosaurids. Much of the snout was formed by the premaxillae, which formed the front portion of the upper jaw. The fossa praemaxillaris, a groove that ran parallel to the tooth row of the upper jaw, was deep and continuous, and ended in a series of aligned foramina (depressions). Behind and above the premaxillae were the nasals, which the holotype preserves in three dimensions, documenting the shape of the upper side of the snout. The back part of the nasal had a downward-extending bulge that was similar to that of related genera such as Ophthalmosaurus. This bulge gave rise to a short, robust, wing-like extension that formed an overhang over the rear of the bony nostril; this feature was also present in Ophthalmosaurus and Platypterygius australis. The edge of this overhang was roughened, indicating this was probably the attachment site for a soft tissue structure.

The back part of the skull roof is incompletely known from the hind part of the lacrimal bone (in front of the eye opening), the postfrontal (above and behind the eye opening), the parietal (at the rear of the skull roof), and parts of a supratemporal that formed the rear corners of the skull roof. A forward-directed extension of the supratemporal formed the internal rear edge of the supratemporal fenestra, an opening in the skull roof situated behind the eyes. The parietal, which would have formed the inner margin of the supratemporal fenestra, had a convex front margin that would have interdigitated (interlocked) with either the frontal or postfrontal bones, which are not preserved in the known specimens.

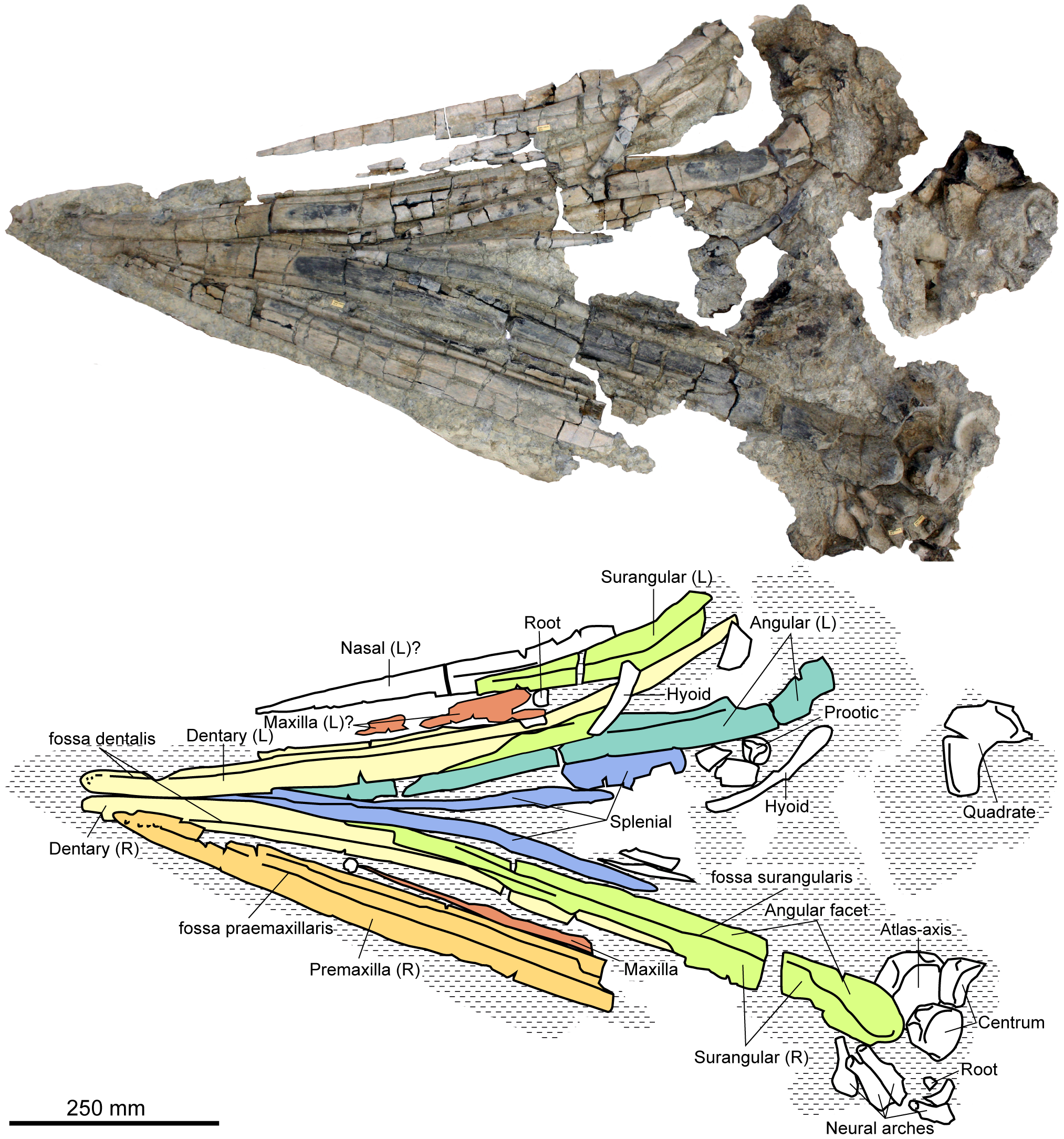
Skull and partial neck of SNHM1284-R seen from below, with interpretative diagram

When viewed from the side, the quadrate bone, which connected to the lower jaw to form the jaw joint, was C-shaped. Two probable hyoid bones (tongue bones) are preserved in specimen SNHM1284-R; these bones were rod-like with one spatula-shaped end. The stapes had a shaft that was more slender than in any other ichthyosaur, and its head was large and square; these features are regarded as an autapomorphy—a characteristic that distinguishes the genus from related genera. The basisphenoid had a well-developed crest on its upper surface; this is considered another autapomorphy because this surface was a wide, flat plateau in other ichthyosaur species. At its front end, the basisphenoid was fused to the parasphenoid (another bone within the lower part of the braincase) and no suture (border between the two bones) can be seen.

The supraoccipital at the upper rear of the braincase (part of the skull which encloses the brain) was only weakly arched; it thus differed from those of Platypterygius and Baptanodon, which were U-shaped. Below the supraoccipital were the two exoccipitals, which formed the sides of the foramen magnum (the canal for the spinal cord). Located further below was the basioccipital, which formed the floor of the foramen magnum. The midline canal that formed this floor was bordered by ridges, giving a bilobed appearance when seen from above; this is also regarded as an autapomorphy of the genus. Below the foramen magnum, the basioccipital formed the occipital condyle, which connected with the first vertebra of the neck to form the head joint. The occipital condyle was well-demarcated from the remainder of the bone by a constricted band, unlike most other ophthalmosaurids. The condyle was rounded and had visible growth rings, as in related genera. The opisthotics, which are on either side of the basioccipital, possessed extensions called the paroccipital processes which pointed backwards and upwards. These processes were elongated and slender in Acamptonectes and Ophthalmosaurus, but short and stout in other ophthalmosaurids.

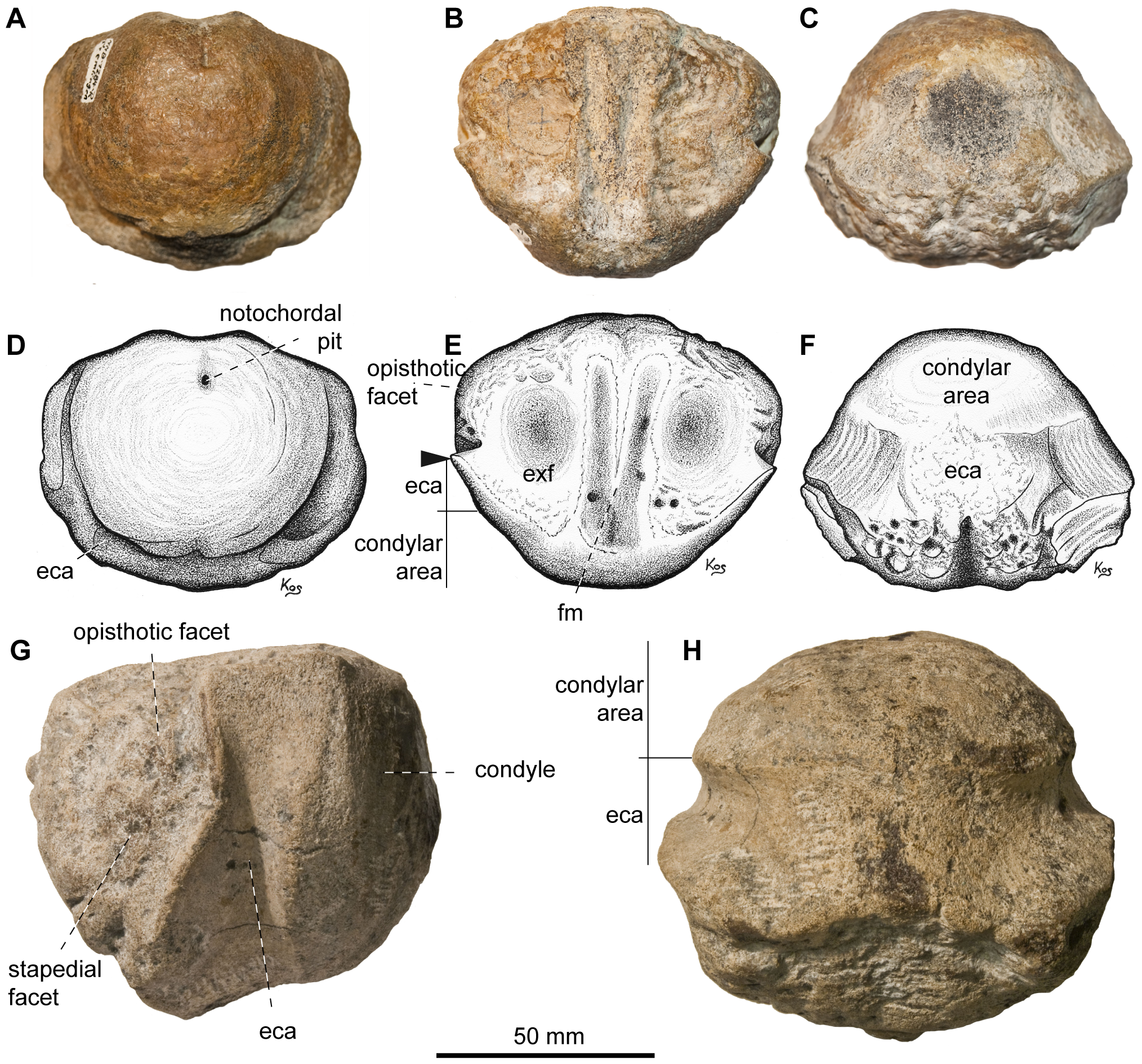
Basioccipitals from the occiputs of SNHM1284-R (A–F) and the holotype (G–H); extracondylar area is labelled as eca

The dentary (the tooth-bearing bone at the front of the lower jaw) was elongated, straight, and had a blunt front tip; this contrasts with the down-turned and beak-like tips of some ichthyosaurs in the subfamily Platypterygiinae. The splenial bones expanded in depth at their rear, forming the lower margin of the mandible and much of its midline surface. A groove similar in morphology to the fossa premaxilliaris of the upper jaw, termed the fossa dentalis, ran parallel to the dentary. Two Acamptonectes specimens lack the "3"-shaped upper surface of the angular bones that are otherwise typical of ophthalmosaurids; instead, the surface in these specimens consists of a simple, flat groove bordered by two walls. Because the "3" shape is present in the holotype specimen, however, this feature may have varied between individuals or growth stages. The articular bone in one specimen was stouter than those in other ophthalmosaurids, which were nearly as thick as it was long.

The teeth of Acamptonectes had striated bases and quadrangular roots, as in numerous ophthalmosaurids, but they were not square like those of Platypterygius. Some of the roots of SNHM1284-R had resorption pits, indicating its teeth were still growing. The only-known complete tooth crown was small compared to those of other ophthalmosaurids; it was also slender and sharply pointed, and similar to the teeth from the rear of the jaw in Baptanodon. The bottom two-thirds of the crown had subtle, longitudinal ridges and was covered in a coarse texture that was nevertheless finer than those in Aegirosaurus and some Platypterygius specimens. The base of the crown was slightly bulbous and almost smooth, unlike those in other ophthalmosaurids.

=== Postcranial skeleton ===
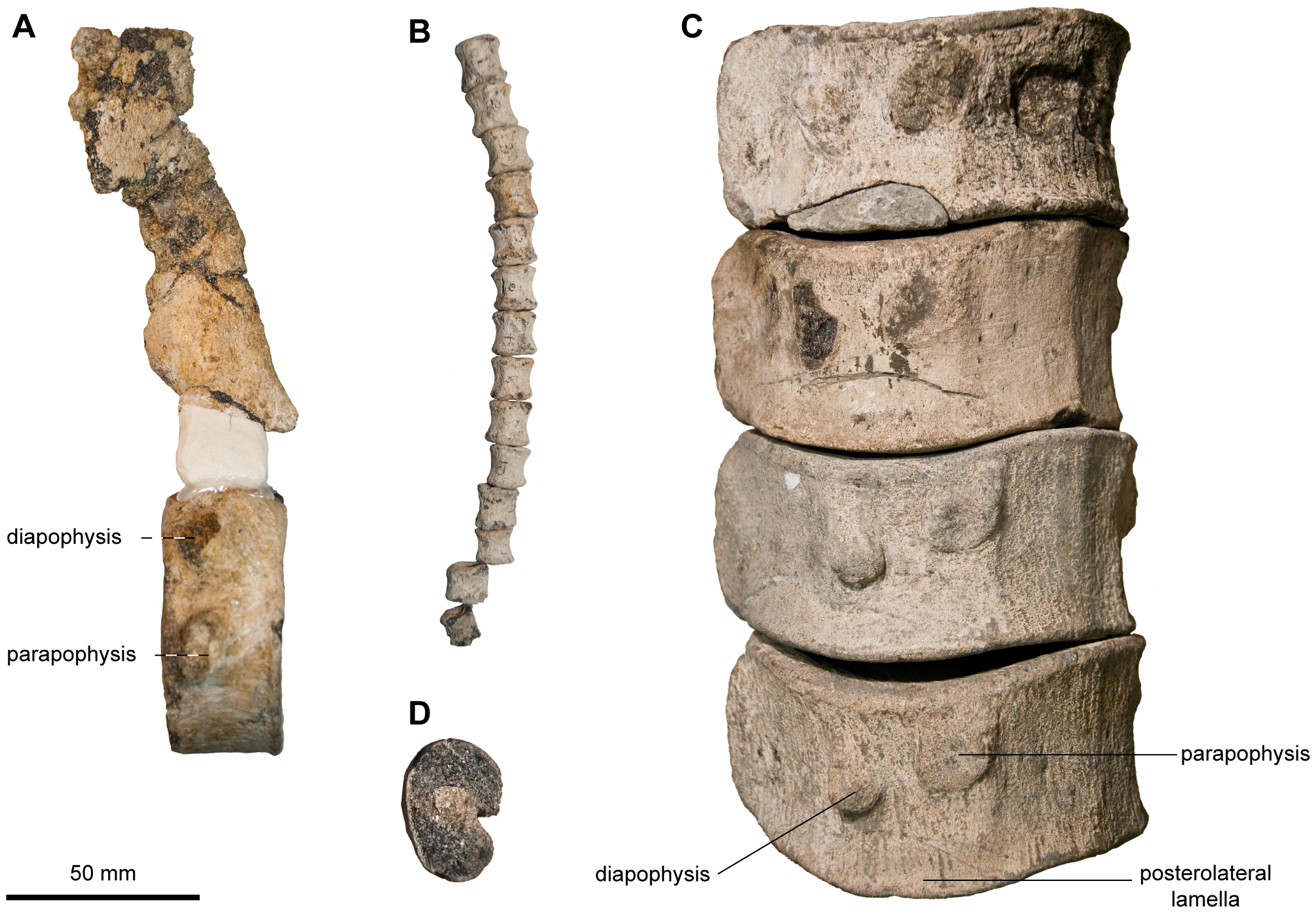
Distinguishing vertebral features; proportionally large neural spine in a dorsal of SNHM1284-R (A), square shape of caudals in same specimen (B), curved lamellae in dorsals of the holotype (C), and cross-section of a rib of NHMUK R11185 (D), showing robusticity and a small groove

As was typical for ichthyosaurs, the vertebral centra of Acamptonectes were disc-shaped and deeply concave on both ends. The processes (bony projections that serve as muscle and rib attachments) projecting from the centra were greatly reduced as an adaptation for its fully aquatic lifestyle. In Acamptonectes, the front-most cervical (neck) centra were high and short, and the following cervical and dorsal (trunk) centra become progressively longer. In the rear dorsal vertebral column, the centra became shorter and higher; this trend peaked at the first caudal (tail) vertebra, which was 3.12 times as high as it was long. The remaining caudals became longer and lower again; the caudals, which comprised the fin, were as long as they were high, a feature that was previously identified only in P. platydactylus.

The first two cervicals—the atlas and axis—were fused into a single complex that was wide when viewed from the rear. The front dorsal vertebrae have diapophyses (sideways-protruding processes to which ribs attach) fused to the centra; this feature was shared with several other ophthalmosaurids. The centra of the dorsal vertebrae were autapomorphic, being tightly interlocking and having extensive posterolateral lamellae (ridges lining the rear surfaces of the centra). This interlocking stiffened the front section of the vertebral column in conjunction with the strong occiput of the skull. Such stiffening can be observed in other ichthyosaurs belonging to the wider group Thunnosauria, though not to the degree as seen in Acamptonectes.

The neural arches of the vertebrae had narrow pre- and postzygapophyses (articular processes projecting forward and backward from the centra) that were unpaired (fused into a single element) in all vertebrae. In contrast, in P. hercynicus and Sveltonectes, these processes were paired in the front of the vertebral column. The neural spines (large upward-projecting processes) were of variable height within each specimen; they were markedly longer in some dorsals than others, reaching 1.25 times the height of the largest centrum. These long spines may be bony extensions that are analogous to the extraneural processes, a row of bones located above the tops of the neural spines that are preserved in two juvenile Stenopterygius specimens. The top surfaces of the neural spines were often pitted, indicating they had a cartilage covering. The ribs were distinct in being robust with a round cross-section; this contrasted with the "8"-shaped cross-section that is seen in other thunnosaurian ichthyosaurs.

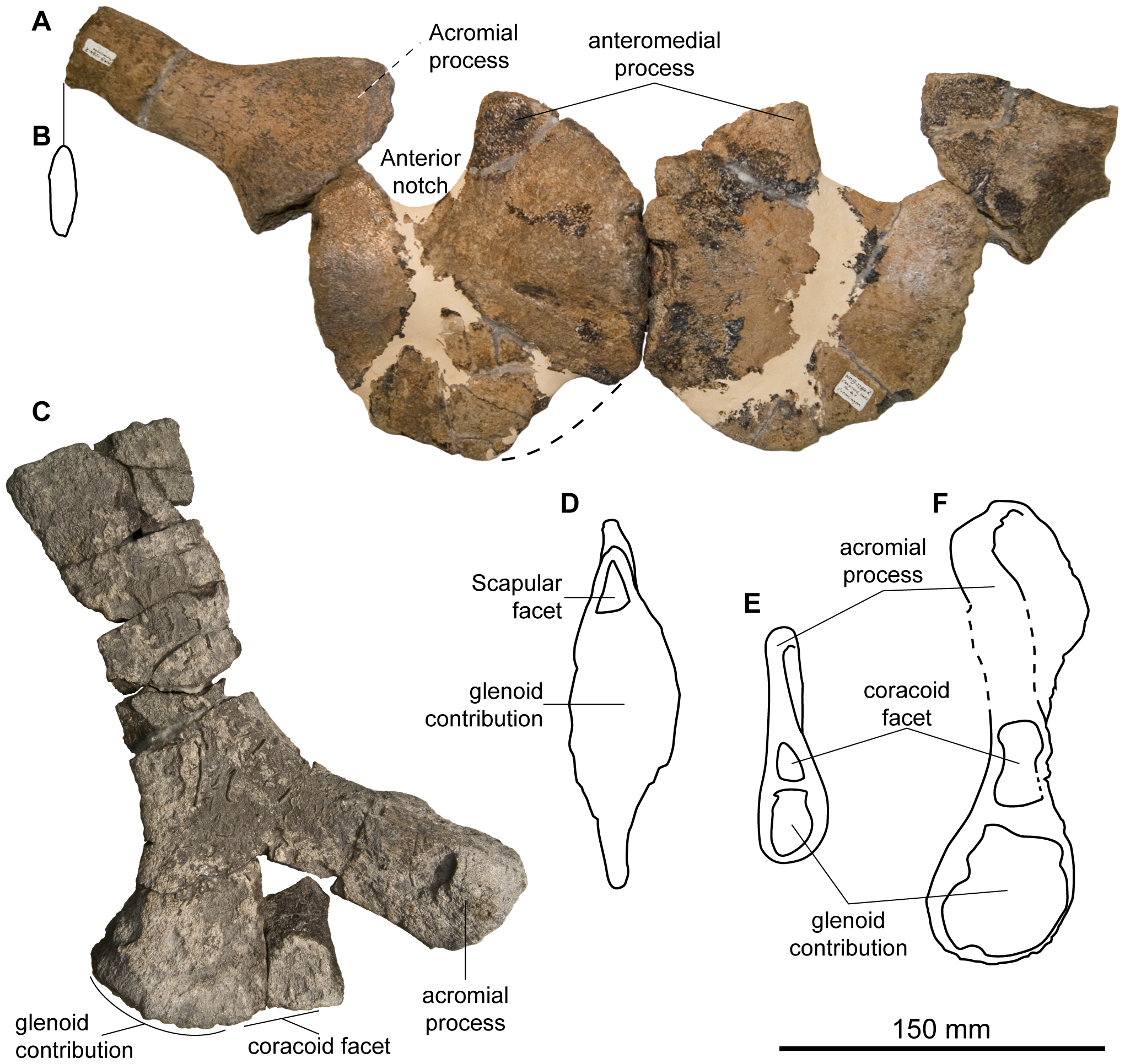
Bones of the scapular girdles of SNHM1284-R and the holotype

The coracoid (a paired bone in the scapular girdle) was roughly hexagonal, contrasting with the rounded shape in Platypterygius, and had outer and midline edges that were straight and parallel. The upper and lower surfaces were slightly paddle-shaped, and the mid-line surface was eye-shaped as in Ophthalmosaurus, although it was not as thick as those in Sveltonectes and P. australis. The mid-line surface was unfinished and had deep pits, indicating the presence of a thick layer of cartilage. At the front, the mid-line margin was strongly deflected outward, forming the rugose (roughened and wrinkled) edge of a wide, sheet-like process similar to that in Ophthalmosaurus. The process was separated from the scapular facet (articulation with the scapula) by a deep, wide notch, as in many Ophthalmosaurus specimens. The scapular facet of the coracoid was small, deeply pitted, and triangular while the glenoid facet (articulation with the humerus) was large and eye-shaped. These facets were not markedly separated, unlike those in Sveltonectes, where they were set at an angle of 100°. The hind margin of the coracoid was sheet-like and lacked a notch.

As with its coracoid, the scapula (shoulder blade) of Acamptonectes was similar to that of Ophthalmosaurus. It was strongly compressed from side to side, unlike that in P. hercynicus, in which the shaft was thick and rod-like. The lower part of the scapula was expanded from front to back, forming a wide, rugose, articular, tear-drop-shaped surface that articulated with the coracoid and glenoid facets. It had a large, flat, fan-like acromial process at the front (which connected with the clavicle), like those in Ophthalmosaurus and P. americanus. The coracoid facet of the scapula was triangular and continuous with the larger glenoid facet, as in Ophthalmosaurus but unlike P. australis. The side and mid-line surfaces of the acromial process were slightly concave.

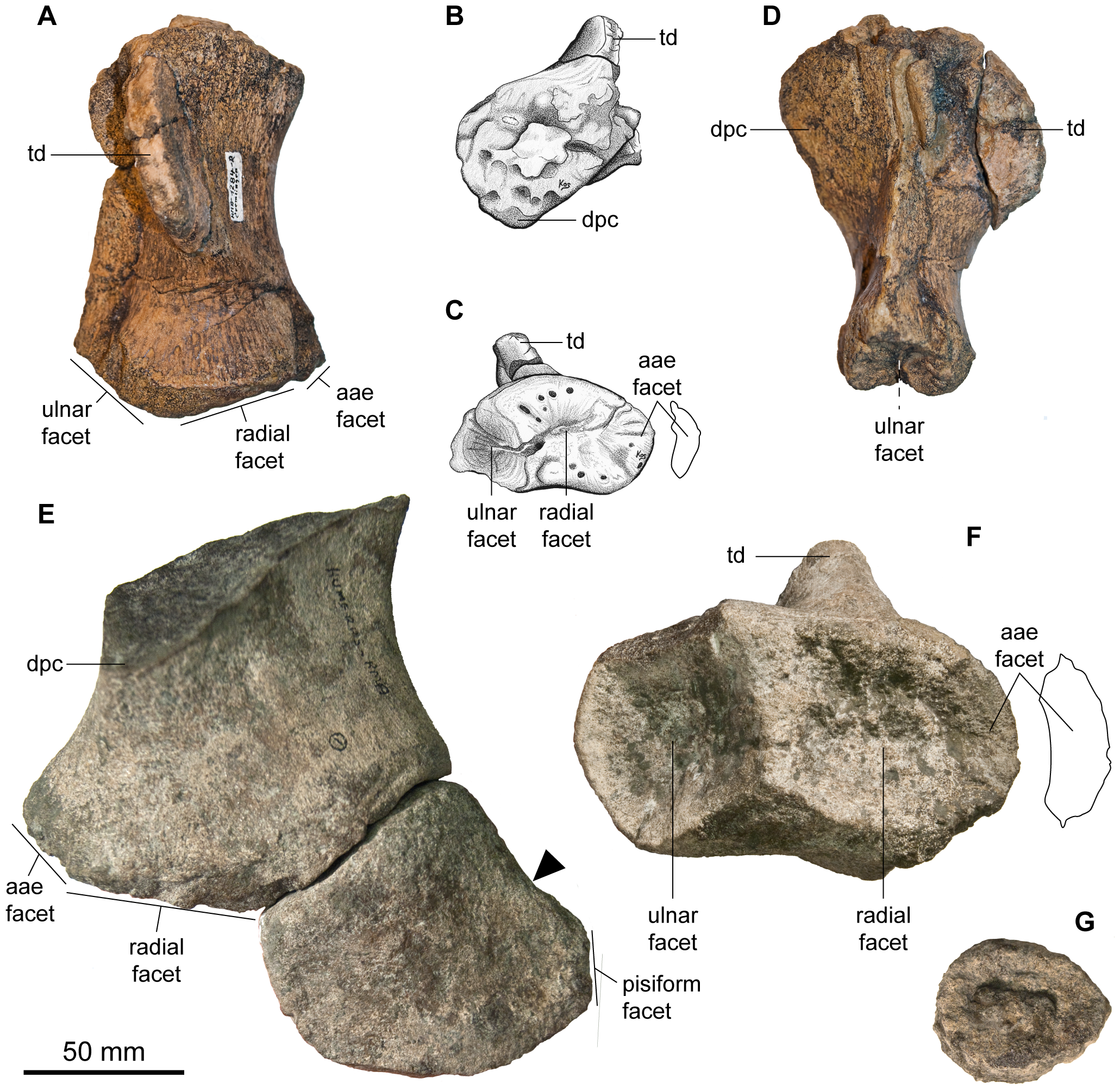
Forefin elements of NBM1284-R (A–D) and the holotype (E–G)

The deltopectoral crest (to where the deltoid muscle attached) on the upper-front part of the humerus was more prominent in Acamptonectes than in Ophthalmosaurus and Arthropterygius, but less so than in Sveltonectes and Platypterygius. On the opposite side of the upper humerus, the trochanter dorsalis (a tubercle or protrusion where muscles attached) was tall and narrow, as in Sveltonectes and many species of Platypterygius. The humerus had three facets on its lower side, including a facet for a bone at the front and a backward-deflected facet for the ulna, which was also similar to that of Ophthalmosaurus, and had five articular processes. The expanded upper surface that articulated with the humerus was slightly concave and pitted, unlike that of Arthropterygius, in which the ulna's humerus facet formed a pyramidal-shaped process.

The facet for the radius was straight and trapezoidal, and merged with facets for two wrist bones, the intermedium and the ulnare. The facet for the pisiform, another wrist bone, was small and triangular, and was located at the back of the ulna's lower side. The ulna had a concave and edge-like hind margin. The phalanx bones (finger bones within the flipper) were oval as in Ophthalmosaurus, Arthropterygius, and some species of Brachypterygius; they tapered away from the body, and the edges of the peripheral phalanx bones were irregular and slightly concave.

== Classification ==
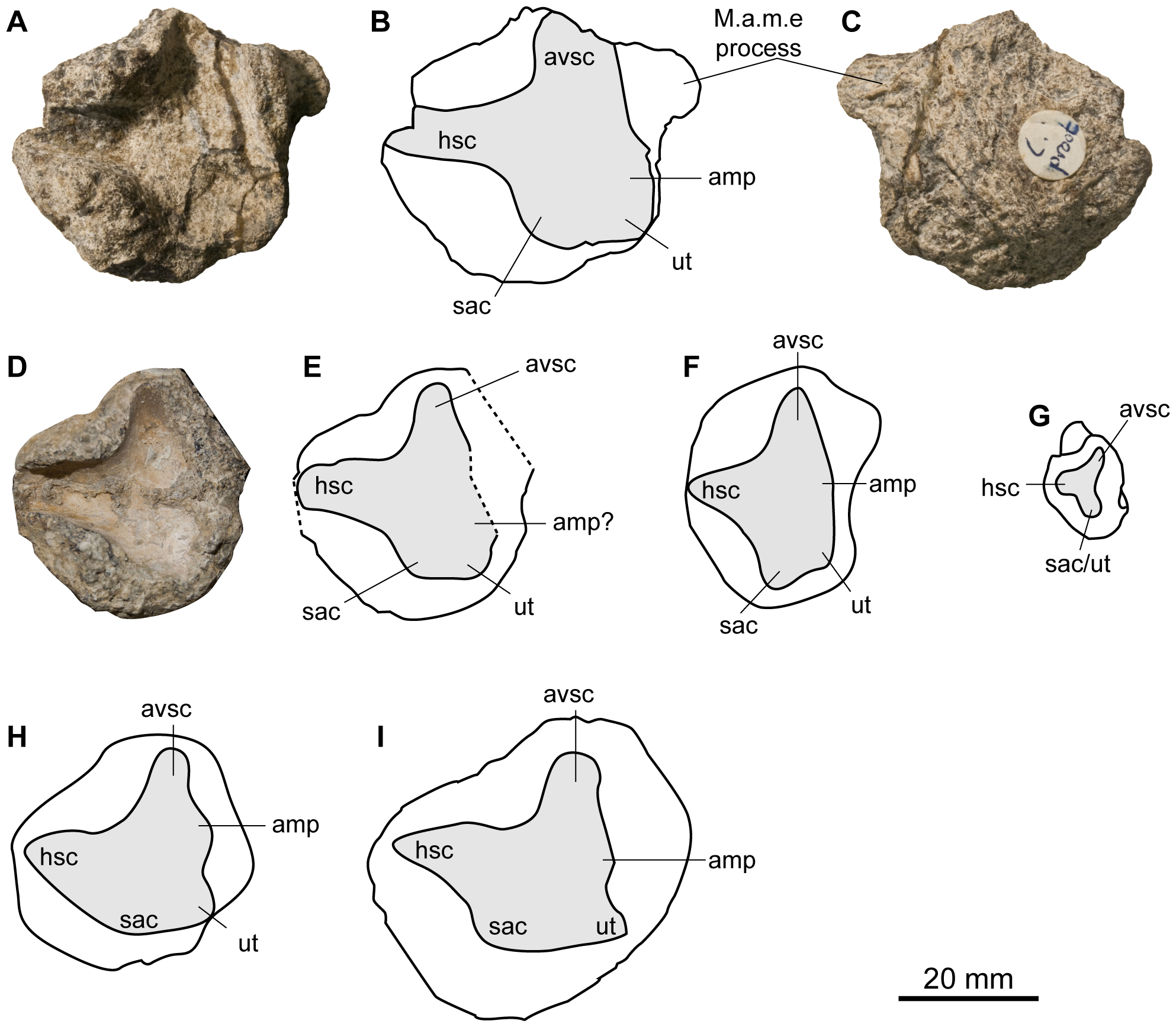
Left prootic bone of two Acamptonectes specimens (A–E) compared with those of other ophthalmosaurids (F–I)

In 2012, a phylogenetic analysis conducted by Fischer and colleagues found Acamptonectes to be a member of the family Ophthalmosauridae based on several characteristics. These include: the reduced extracondylar area (a band of bone surrounding the occipital condyle), the plate-like dorsal trochanter of the humerus, the presence of a facet at the front of the humerus' bottom end for a paddle bone, and the lack of notching in the paddle bones that was considered to be homoplastic (independently acquired). It was also found to be more closely related to other ophthalmosaurids than Arthropterygius based on the large processes of the basipterygoids (bones at the base of the braincase), the lack of a peg on the basioccipital, and the large trochanters of the femur.

Relationships within Ophthalmosauridae have historically been unstable in analyses due to the fragmentary nature of many ophthalmosaurid specimens; furthermore, many ophthalmosaurid genera are known from a single specimen. Removal of these fragmentary genera, however, has degraded the resolution of analyses even further. The phylogenetic analysis conducted by Fischer and colleagues in 2012 recovered two novel clades (groups) within Ophthalmosauridae; the Ophthalmosaurinae and Platypterygiinae, the existence of which had long been suspected by ichthyosaur researchers—Maxim Arkhangelsky had named the clades as subfamilies as early as 2001—but had not yet been supported robustly by the results of phylogenetic analyses. Fischer and colleagues placed Acamptonectes was placed in the former clade, although its placement there represented a secondary reversal of the group's only uniting characteristic; a notch on the bottom of the basioccipital.

Within the Ophthalmosaurinae, various positions have been recovered for Acamptonectes due to the same issues. In 2012, Fischer and colleagues found that it grouped closest with "Ophthalmosaurus" natans, with Ophthalmosaurus icenicus and Mollesaurus being successively less-closely related. The relationship with "O." natans was formed on account of the reduced presence of striations on the teeth, although Fischer and colleagues indicated this characteristic was homoplastic so they did not consider it sufficient to resurrect the previously used genus name Baptanodon for "O." natans. In 2013, they recovered the same arrangement in a derivative analysis for the description of Malawania, as did Nikolay Zverkov and colleagues in a 2015 analysis focusing on Grendelius—albeit with a clade consisting of Cryopterygius, Undorosaurus, and Paraophthalmosaurus being closer to Acamptonectes than Mollesaurus.

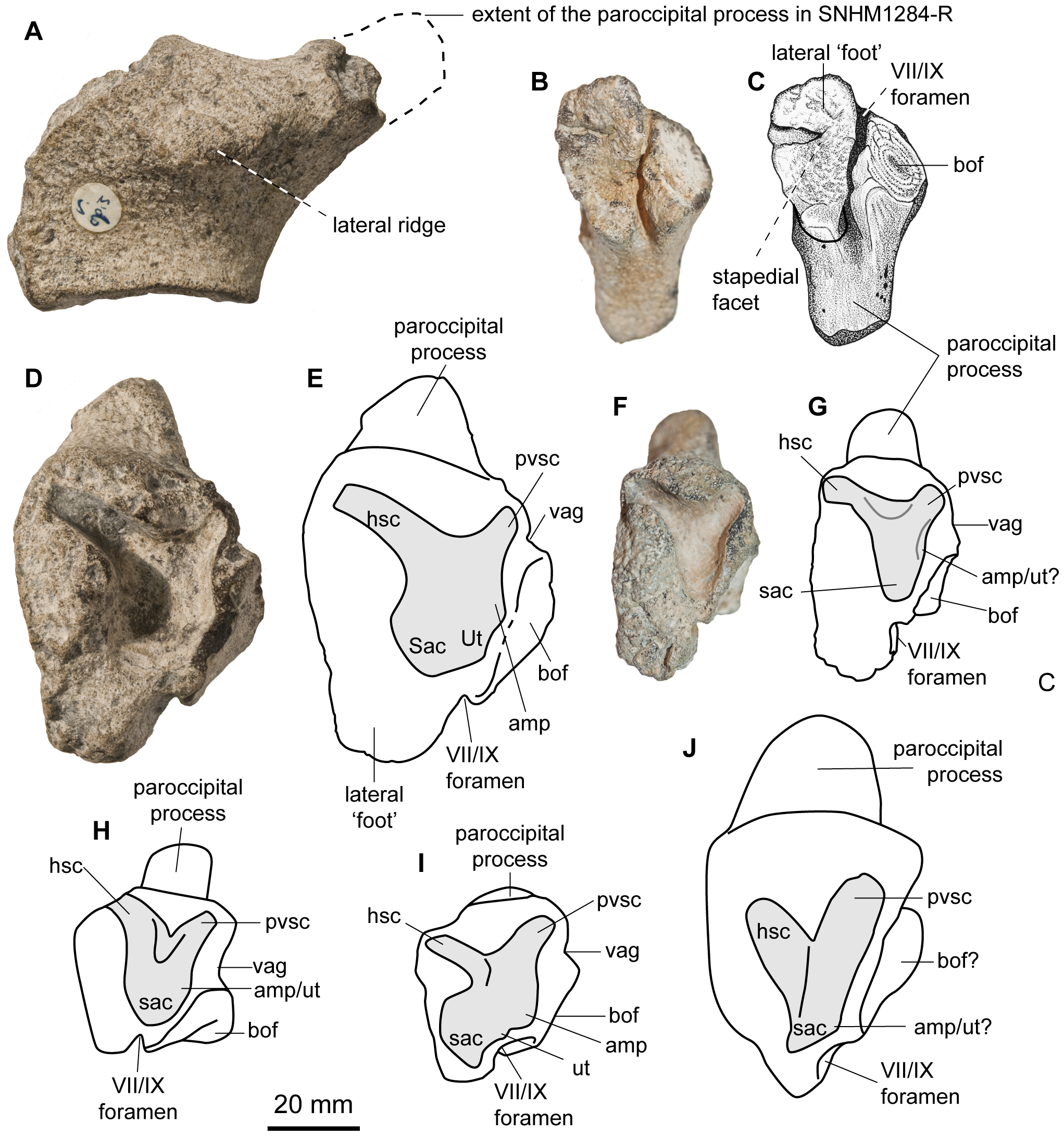
Right opisthotics of three Acamptonectes specimens (A–G) compared with those of other ophthalmosaurids (H–J)

Arkhangelsky and Zverkov previously recovered all of these species with the exception of Mollesaurus in a polytomy (unresolved clade) in 2014. A 2019 analysis by Zverkov and Vladimir Efimov found an otherwise identical arrangement, in which the positions of Mollesaurus and Acamptonectes were exchanged, which was also found in another 2019 analysis by Zverkov and Natalya Prilepskaya, and in the 2020 description of a new specimen of Muiscasaurus by María Páramo-Fonseca and colleagues, in which Muiscasaurus was the next-closest relative of these species. In their description of Acuetzpalin, a 2020 analysis by Jair Barrientos-Lara and Jesús Alvarado-Ortega found "O." natans and O. icenicus to form a clade with the exclusion of Mollesaurus and then Acamptonectes, which was also recovered by Megan Jacobs and David Martill in their 2020 description of Thalassodraco.

A 2014 analysis of the description of Janusaurus conducted by Aubrey Roberts and colleagues found Acamptonectes to be the sister group to a clade consisting of O. icenicus and Leninia, which collectively constituted one branch of the Ophthalmosaurinae. The same arrangement was recovered by a 2017 analysis of the description of Keilhauia conducted by Lene Delsett and colleagues. In 2019, another analysis by the same authors found Acamptonectes closer to Janusaurus, Keilhauia, and Palvennia than to Paraophthalmosaurus, "O." natans (as Baptanodon), O. icenicus, or Gengasaurus in successive order of closeness to the base of the Ophthalmosaurinae. In each case, however, the Bremer support—a measure of the likelihood of a phylogenetic tree's arrangement over alternatives—of the groupings was low.

Other analyses also found Acamptonectes within unresolved polytomies. For the 2016 description of Muiscasaurus, Erin Maxwell and colleagues found O. icenicus, "O." natans, Undorosaurus, and Acamptonectes in a polytomy at the base of the Ophthalmosauridae. Contrary to most analyses, they did not recover a distinct Ophthalmosaurinae. Also in 2016, Fischer and colleagues found Ophthalmosaurinae to consist of Mollesaurus as the sister group to a polytomy including O. icenicus, "O." natans, Leninia, Acamptonectes, and a group containing Cryopterygius, Janusaurus, and Palvennia. In 2019, Maxwell, Dirley Cortés, Pedro Patarroyo, and Parra Ruge recovered a poorly-resolved Ophthalmosauridae containing Acamptonectes in a large polytomy. In their 2020 description of Arthropterygius thalassonotus, Lisandro Campos and colleagues placed Acamptonectes in a polytomy with O. icenicus, Leninia, and Athabascasaurus, which formed the sister group to a clade of Keilhauia and Undorosaurus; the base of the Ophthalmosaurinae was formed by a polytomy of those species, and Baptanodon and Gengasaurus.

The phylogenetic tree from the analysis of Páramo-Fonseca and colleagues in 2020 is reproduced below.

- Ophthalmosauridae
  - - Gengasaurus nicosiai
    - Paraophthalmosaurus saveljeviensis
    - Nannopterygius enthekiodon
  - - Arthropterygius
      - Arthropterygius volgensis
      - Arthropterygius? lundi (Janusaurus)
      - - Arthropterygius? hoybolgerti (Palvennia)
        - Arthropterygius chrisorum
    - - Ophthalmosaurinae
        - Muiscasaurus catheti
        - - Acamptonectes densus
          - - Ophthalmosaurus icenicus
            - - Mollesaurus periallus
              - "Ophthalmosaurus" natans (Baptanodon)
      - Platypterygiinae

=== Palaeobiogeography ===
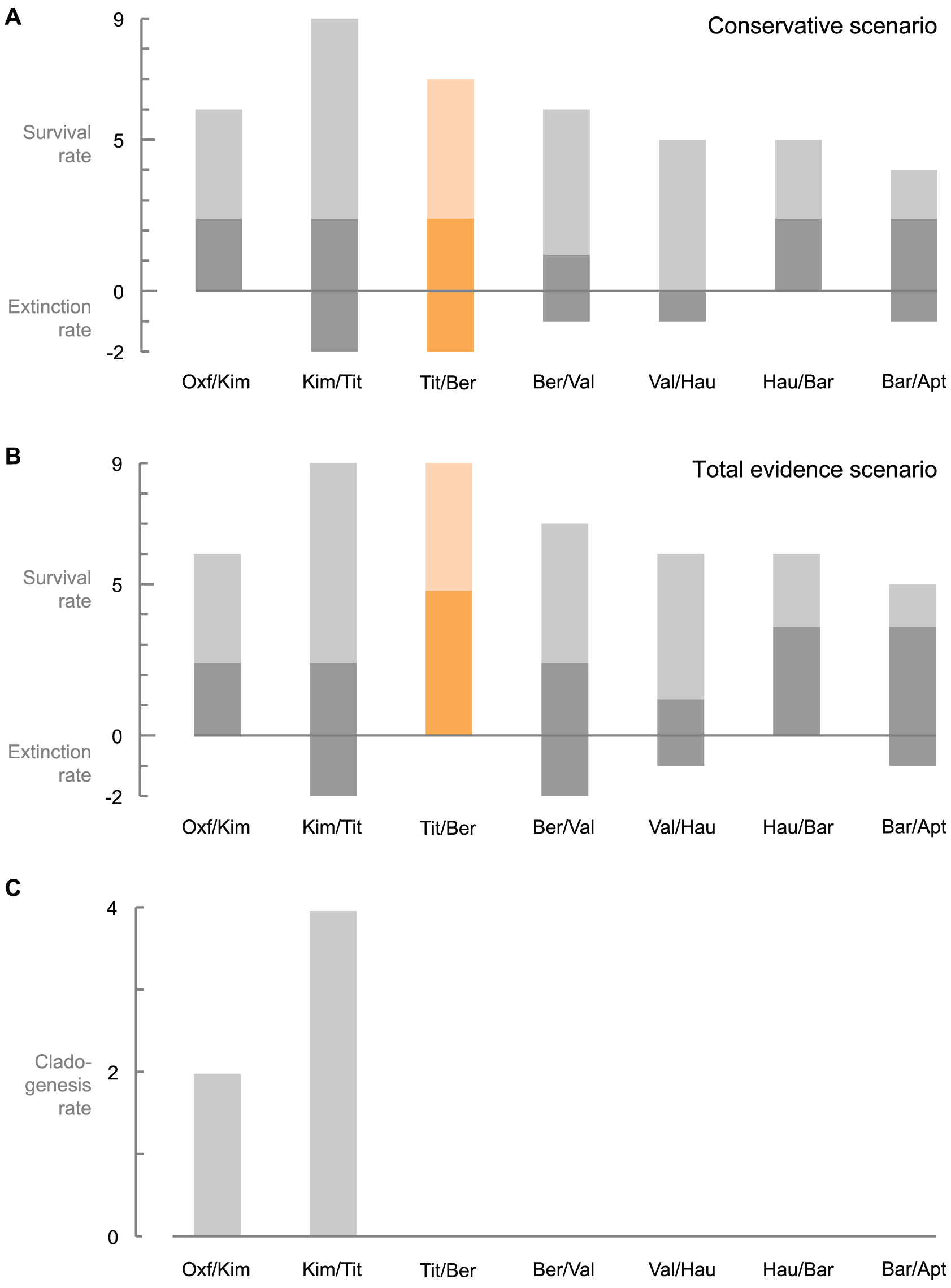
Diagrams showing survival, extinction, and cladogenesis rates of ophthalmosaurids for each boundary of the Oxfordian–Barremian interval, per Fischer and colleagues, 2012

Ichthyosaurs were traditionally thought to have been affected by three extinction events; one at the Triassic–Jurassic boundary, one at the Jurassic–Cretaceous boundary, and a final extinction in the Cretaceous at the boundary of the Cenomanian and Turonian ages that left no survivors. Some researchers suggested their species diversity declined after the mid-Jurassic, with the ichthyosaurs continuing until they disappeared at the end of the Cenomanian. This decline was thought to have been associated with a transition in the dominant ichthyosaur lineage; the large-eyed, thunniform (tuna-like) ophthalmosaurines, which were successful and widespread notwithstanding their hyper-specialisation, would have been replaced by the more generalised platypterygiines, which had smaller eyes and longer bodies.

Acamptonectes is a significant find because it is an ophthalmosaurine from the Early Cretaceous, demonstrating the ophthalmosaurines were not entirely wiped out at the Jurassic–Cretaceous boundary. Fischer and colleagues also found evidence of other ophthalmosaurines in the Early Cretaceous by reanalyzing known material, including the Nettleton Ophthalmosaurus specimens. They also cited reports of the Late Jurassic-aged platypterygiines Brachypterygius, Aegirosaurus, Caypullisaurus, and Yasykovia—which has been synonymised with Nannopterygius—from the Early Cretaceous.

By tabulating the number of genera that disappeared in each age, Fischer and colleagues found no clear boundary between individual ages from the Late Jurassic (Oxfordian) to Early Cretaceous (Aptian) that could be considered an extinction event for ophthalmosaurids. The Jurassic–Cretaceous boundary had a net extinction rate of 0 and even the highest survival rates. By counting the number of new clades that emerged, however, they computed the cladogenesis (clade formation) rate to have been lower in the Cretaceous. They concluded—contrary to traditional thinking—the Jurassic-Cretaceous extinction event had a negligible impact on ichthyosaurs compared to its impact on other marine reptiles, and that ophthalmosaurids remained diverse until their final extinction.

== Palaeobiology ==
With their dolphin-like bodies, ichthyosaurs were better adapted to their aquatic environment than any other group of marine reptiles. They were viviparous that gave birth to live young and were likely incapable of leaving the water. As homeotherms ("warm-blooded") with high metabolic rates, ichthyosaurs would have been active swimmers. Jurassic and Cretaceous ichthyosaurs, including Acamptonectes, had evolved a thunniform method of swimming rather than the anguilliform (undulating or eel-like) methods of earlier species. Thunniform ichthyosaurs were able to swim faster and more efficiently than other marine reptiles of similar sizes, and were better adapted to a pelagic (open-ocean) lifestyle. Their swimming was aided by their compact bodies and crescent-shaped tail fins.

Most of the skeleton of Acamptonectes appears to have been unusually rigid, which would have severely limited the extent of side-to-side motion in the front part of the skeleton. Its snout was also shallower than those in related species, and its ribs were more rounded in cross-section. According to palaeontologist Darren Naish, one of the describers of the genus, these may have been further adaptations to increase the stiffness of the animal's body by making these body parts more resistant to bending. The tightly packed occipital bones and cervical vertebrae would have allowed limited movement in the neck, suggesting Acamptonectes must have "shot through the water like a dart", according to fellow describer Ulrich Joger.

=== Diet and feeding ===
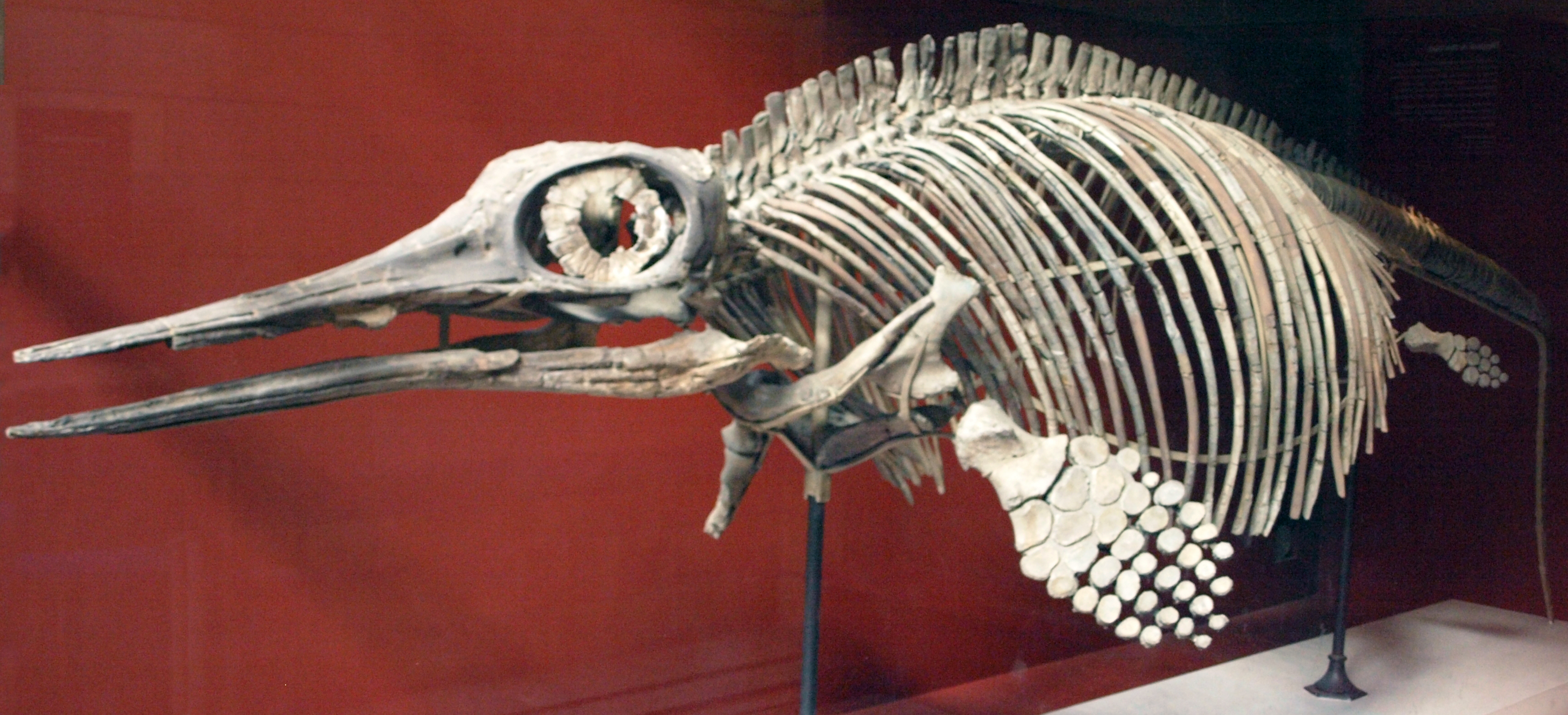
Reconstructed skeleton of the closely related Ophthalmosaurus; the large scleral rings indicate the size of the eyeballs and mode of vision

As an ophthalmosaurine, Acamptonectes would likely have been an opportunistic generalist predator that fed on fish and squid. Adaptations for speed suggest that Acamptonectes and other ophthalmosaurines were likely also pursuit predators. In 1987, paleontologist Judy A. Massare proposed "feeding guilds" as a way to group marine reptiles; some ichthyosaur species were thought to have "pierced" small prey using needle-like teeth, and others to have "crunched" hard-shelled prey using robust teeth. In 2012, palaeontologist Maria Zammit suggested that the slender tooth crowns with longitudinal ridges seen in Acamptonectes (which placed it in the "pierce II/generalist" guild) were likely used to impale rather than grasp prey, and its diet may thus have consisted of fleshy prey that did not have a hard exterior. Nevertheless, she noted that its shallow snout and unique tooth morphology may indicate a different diet and lifestyle from other known Cretaceous ichthyosaurs.

Ichthyosaurs had the largest eyes of any known vertebrate group, which can be inferred from bones in the eye sockets known as scleral rings, and would therefore have possessed sensitive low-light vision that would have aided prey capture at great depths. In the related genus Ophthalmosaurus, the maximum diameter of the eyeball would have been 23 centimetres (9.1 in), allowing movement to be detected at depths of 300 metres (980 ft) in the mesopelagic zone. Ophthalmosaurus could likely dive for around 20 minutes and reach depths of at least 600 metres (2,000 ft). In addition to good eyesight, the enlarged olfactory region of the brain indicates ichthyosaurs had a sensitive sense of smell.

== Palaeoecology ==
=== Speeton Clay ===
Incomplete holotype basicranium and interclavicle of Ichthyosaurus brunsvicensis, a possible Acamptonectes specimen from Germany destroyed during World War II

Acamptonectes is known from rocks dating to the Hauterivian stage of the Lower Cretaceous (approximately 133 to 129 million years old) in the Speeton Clay Formation of England, which is composed of claystone and mudrock, and is generally about 100–130 metres (330–430 ft) thick. The Acamptonectes holotype came from the D2D beds and the specimen NHMUK R11185 came from the slightly older D2C beds. Material preserved in these sediments is sometimes reworked from the underlying older Valanginian rocks rather than originating from the Hauterivian. The holotype of Acamptonectes is partially articulated, as were some nearby crinoid fossils, indicating the specimen was not reworked and genuinely came from the Hauterivian.

Carbon-13 concentration (δ^{13}C) levels in the Speeton Clay Formation increased during the Valanginian and the early Hauterivian. This may have occurred when land submerged by rising sea levels released carbon-13 into the oceans. Concentrations of oxygen 18 (δ^{18}O), however, increased during this time, indicating an episode of cooling; specifically, δ^{18}O levels in belemnite fossils indicate the temperature of the Speeton Clay was about 11 °C (52 °F) at the beginning of the Hauterivian, rose to 15 °C (59 °F) during the middle part of this stage, and reverted to 11 °C (52 °F) by its end. Evidence of photosynthetic organisms indicate the Speeton Clay environment was at least partially located in the photic zone (the layer in the ocean that light reaches).

Numerous other organisms have been recovered from the Speeton Clay Formation; many of these were borers, including foraminiferans, fungi, chlorophyte algae, and various animals such as sponges, polychaetes, brachiopods, barnacles, bivalves, and echinoids. In addition to the crinoids, other invertebrates in the Speeton Clay Formation are represented by a wide variety of ammonites and belemnites. While both bony fish and cartilaginous fish—the latter group represented by sharks and rays of various types—are known from the Speeton Clay, they are poorly preserved and not very abundant. Marine reptiles are uncommon in this formation; other than Acamptonectes, they are represented by some fragmentary plesiosaur remains.

=== Lower Saxony Basin ===
SNHM1284-R, the German specimen of Acamptonectes, comes from late Hauterivian rocks of the Lower Saxony Basin near Cremlingen in eastern Lower Saxony. The Lower Cretaceous sediments of this basin are rich in siliclastic rocks that were deposited in the southern region of the proto-North Sea, an epicontinental sea covering much of Northwest Germany during the Lower Cretaceous. Since this region linked the warmer Tethys Sea and the colder Boreal Sea, its environment was very susceptible to change. The late Hauterivian rocks of the region were deposited in the neritic zone (shallow seas) during a time of alternating marine transgression and regression (rising and falling sea levels). The surface waters were generally cool, although they sometimes warmed when warmer water from the Tethys Sea entered the region. Sedimentation rates were high and the bottom waters were somewhat anoxic (oxygen deprived). Organisms that inhabited this sea include dinoflagellates, ammonites, and belemnites.

== See also ==
- List of ichthyosaur genera
- List of ichthyosaur type specimens
- Timeline of ichthyosaur research
