= Myobradypterygius =

Myobradypterygius Temporal range: Early Cretaceous, ~145–125 Ma

Scientific classification
- Kingdom: Animalia
- Phylum: Chordata
- Class: Reptilia
- Order: †Ichthyosauria
- Family: †Ophthalmosauridae
- Genus: †Myobradypterygius von Huene, 1927

Type species
- †Myobradypterygius hauthali von Huene, 1927

Synonyms
- Platypterygius hauthali McGowan, 1972

Extinct genus of ophthalmosaurid ichthyosaur

Myobradypterygius is an extinct genus of ophthalmosaurid ichthyosaur from the Early Cretaceous (Barremian-Hauterivian) of Argentina and possibly also Chile. One species is known, M. hauthali, which was once believed to have been a species of Platypterygius.

== Discovery and naming ==
The holotype, MLP 79-I-30-2, a vertebral column and associated forelimbs, was discovered between 1900 and 1925 by Rudolph Hauthal at Nevado de Famatina, Argentina. The specimen was first described by von Huene (1925) and he reconstructed the forelimb, and described it as being related to Myopterygius (now Pervushovisaurus).

A second specimen, MLP 79-I-30-1, which included a left humerus and a forefin, was described by von Huene (1927) and in the same paper, both specimens were believed to belong to the same species, which was named Myobradypoterygius hauthali.

A second species, M. mollensis, was named by Carlos Rusconi (1938) on the basis of specimen MHN-PV 106, a set of vertebrae found in the Los Molles Formation of Argentina, but it has since been synonymised with Platypterygius and was not mentioned in the 2024 reappraisal of the genus.

McGowan (1972) synonymised M. hauthali with Platypterygius and created the new name Platypterygius hauthali.

Stinnesbeck et al. (2014) described around forty ichthyosaur specimens from the Zapata Formation of Chile, several of which had previously been assigned to Platypterygius, and assigned several of the specimens to what would later become Myobradyopterygius hauthali.

Fernández and Aguirre-Urreta (2005) reviewed the holotype and were the first to determine that it did not belong to Platypterygius. Campos et al. (2024) reinstated the genus Myobradyopterygius and confirmed it is separate from Platypterygius.

== Description ==
Myobradypterygius is thought to have been a small ichthyosaur, with an estimated total body length of 3.5 metres (11 ft).

== Classification ==
In 1925, Myobrachyopterygius was classified as being similar to Perushovisaurus. In 1972, it was allied with Platypterygius, and in 2024, Myobrachyopterygius was classified within Ophthalmosauridae.
