= Ichthyosaurus posthumus =

"Ichthyosaurus" posthumus Temporal range: Late Jurassic, 150.8 Ma

Scientific classification
- Kingdom: Animalia
- Phylum: Chordata
- Class: Reptilia
- Order: †Ichthyosauria
- Family: †Ichthyosauridae
- Genus: †"Ichthyosaurus"

Species
- †"Ichthyosaurus" posthumus Wagner, 1852

Synonyms
- Ichthyosaurus trigonus posthumus (Wagner, 1852); Macropterygius posthumus (Wagner, 1852)

Extinct species of reptile

"Ichthyosaurus" posthumus is a species of ichthyosaurs known from the Late Jurassic (early Tithonian age) Solnhofen Formation of Bavaria, Germany. Though several specimens have been referred to this species in the past, its type specimen consists only of isolated teeth that were destroyed during World War II, and it is today considered a nomen dubium. The teeth almost certainly do not belong to Ichthyosaurus itself, which was a wastebin taxon at the time this species was named.
