= Ichthyosaur =

Ichthyosaurs are extinct marine reptiles. This term can be used as a common name for the members of the following groups:

- Ichthyosauria
  - Ichthyosaurus, an extinct genus of ichthyosaurs
- Ichthyopterygia, which contains Ichthyosauria
- Ichthyosauriformes, which contains Ichthyopterygia
