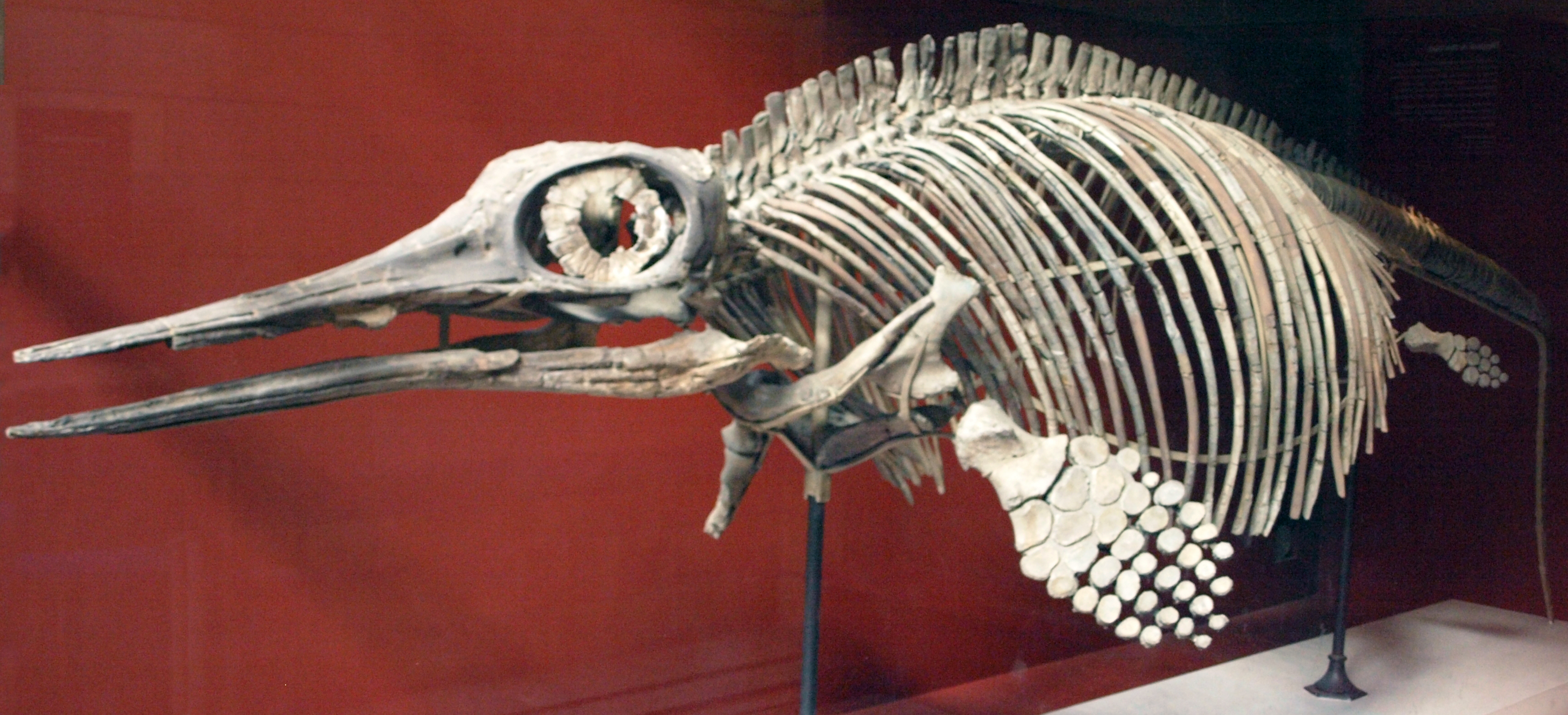
- Composite skeleton (NHMUK PV R3702, R3893, R4124) of Ophthalmosaurus icenicus at the Natural History Museum, London

Scientific classification
- Kingdom: Animalia
- Phylum: Chordata
- Class: Reptilia
- Order: †Ichthyosauria
- Clade: †Baracromia
- Family: †Ophthalmosauridae; Baur, 1887

Subgroups
- †Arthropterygius; †Keilhauia; †Macropterygius; †Muiscasaurus; †Myobradypterygius; †Ophthalmosaurinae; †Platypterygiinae

Synonyms
- Ophthalmosauria

= Ophthalmosauridae =

Ophthalmosaurids Temporal range: Middle Jurassic-Late Cretaceous, 174.1–93.9 Ma

Extinct family of reptiles

Ophthalmosauridae is an extinct family of thunnosaur ichthyosaurs from the Middle Jurassic to the early Late Cretaceous (Bajocian - Cenomanian) worldwide. Almost all ichthyosaurs from the Middle Jurassic onwards belong to the family, until the extinction of ichthyosaurs in the early Late Cretaceous. Ophthalmosaurids appeared worldwide during early Bajocian, subsequent to the disappearance of most other ichthyosaur lineages after the end of the Toarcian. Currently, the oldest known ophthalmosaurids is Mollesaurus from the early Bajocian of Argentina, as well as indeterminate remains of the same age from Luxembourg and Canada. Named by George H. Baur, in 1887, the family contains the basal taxa like Ophthalmosaurus. Appleby (1956) named the taxon Ophthalmosauria which was followed by some authors, but these two names are often treated as synonyms; Ophthalmosauridae has the priority over Ophthalmosauria. However, some researchers argue that Ophthalmosauridae should be restricted to the group typically referred to as Ophthalmosaurinae, with classic Platypterygiinae instead being referred to as Undorosauridae or Brachypterygiidae and Ophthalmosauria being used to unite these two groups.

== Phylogeny ==
Life restoration of Ophthalmosaurus

Ophthalmosauridae is a node-based taxon defined by Ryosuke Motani (1999) as "the last common ancestor of Brachypterygius extremus and Ophthalmosaurus icenicus and all of its descendants". The definition he proposed for Ophthalmosauria was exactly the same. In this case both definitions are synonyms. The cladogram below follows the topology from a 2010 analysis by Patrick S. Druckenmiller and Erin E. Maxwell.

- Thunnosauria
  - Ichthyosaurus
  - - Stenopterygius
    - - "Ophthalmosaurus" natans (=Baptanodon)
      - Ophthalmosauridae
        - - Aegirosaurus
          - Ophthalmosaurus (type species)
        - - Mollesaurus
          - - Athabascasaurus
            - - Brachypterygius
              - - Arthropterygius
                - Caypullisaurus
                - "Platypterygius" hercynicus
                - "Platypterygius" australis (=Longirostria)
                - Platypterygius (type species)
                - - Maiaspondylus
                  - "Platypterygius" americanus (=Tenuirostria)

Valentin Fischer, Edwige Masure, Maxim S. Arkhangelsky and Pascal Godefroit (2011) described a new genus of Ophthalmosauridae. They redefined it as "the last common ancestor of Arthropterygius chrisorum and Ophthalmosaurus icenicus and all of its descendants". In this case Ophthalmosauria isn't a junior synonym of Ophthalmosauridae. The cladogram below follows Fischer et al. 2011.

- Thunnosauria
  - Ichthyosaurus
  - - Stenopterygius
    - - Chacaicosaurus
      - Ophthalmosauridae
        - Arthropterygius
        - *
          - Brachypterygius
          - Ophthalmosaurus (type species)
          - - - Maiaspondylus
              - - Mollesaurus
                - - Aegirosaurus
                  - Sveltonectes
            - - "Platypterygius" hercynicus
              - - Caypullisaurus
                - - Athabascasaurus
                  - "Platypterygius" australis (=Longirostria)

*Note: Placement of Ophthalmosauria by definition.

Fischer et al. (2012) described another new genus of Ophthalmosauridae. They defined for the first time two subfamilies within the Ophthalmosauridae, Ophthalmosaurinae and Platypterygiinae. Ophthalmosaurus and Platypterygius were found to be non-monophyletic. Ophthalmosauridae was characterized by a reduced extracondylar area, a plate-like dorsal trochanter, a humerus with a facet for an anterior accessory element and the absence of notching on the paddle elements of the forefin. The cladogram below follows Fischer et al. 2012.

- Thunnosauria
  - Ichthyosaurus
  - - Stenopterygius
    - - Chacaicosaurus
      - Ophthalmosauridae
        - Arthropterygius
        - *
          - Ophthalmosaurinae
            - Mollesaurus
            - - Ophthalmosaurus (type species)
              - - Baptanodon ("O." natans)
                - Acamptonectes
          - Platypterygiinae
            - - Brachypterygius
              - - Maiaspondylus
                - - Aegirosaurus
                  - Sveltonectes
            - - "Platypterygius" hercynicus
              - - Caypullisaurus
                - - Athabascasaurus
                  - "Platypterygius" australis (=Longirostria)

=== Since 2019 ===
In 2019, two species of Cryopterygius were assigned to the genus Undorosaurus by Zverkov & Efimov (2019). The authors considered the type species of the former genus, C. kristiansenae, to be synonymous with Undorosaurus gorodischensis; second species of Cryopterygius, C. kielanae, was tentatively maintained by the authors as a distinct species within the genus Undorosaurus.

The following cladogram shows a possible phylogenetic positions within Ophthalmosauridae according to the analysis performed by Zverkov and Jacobs (2020).

- Ophthalmosauria
  - - Ophthalmosaurinae
      - - - - Acamptonectes densus
            - - Mollesaurus periallus
              - - Ophthalmosaurus natans
                - Ophthalmosaurus icenicus
      - - - Gengasaurus nicosiai
          - - - Nannopterygius yasykovi
              - - Nannopterygius enthekiodon
                - Nannopterygius saveljeviensis
                - Nannopterygius borealis
            - - - Arthropterygius volgensis
                - - Arthropterygius lundi
                  - Arthropterygius thalassonotus
                  - - Arthropterygius hoybergeti
                    - Arthropterygius chrisorum
    - Platypterygiinae
      - - Brachypterygius extremus
        - Aegirosaurus leptospondylus
        - - Muiscasaurus catheti
          - - Leninia stellans
            - - Sveltonectes insolitus
              - - Athabascasaurus bitumineus
                - - Platypterygius americanus
                  - - - Acuetzpalin carranzai
                      - Platypterygius sachicarum
                      - Caypullisaurus bonapartei
                    - - - - Grendelius mordax
                          - Grendelius alekseevi
                          - Grendelius pseudoscythicus
                          - Grendelius zhuravlevi
                        - - - - Undorosaurus kielanae
                              - - Undorosaurus nessovi
                                - Undorosaurus gorodischensis
                      - - Platypterygius australis
                        - - Plutoniosaurus bedengensis
                          - Simbirskiasaurus birjukovi
                          - Platypterygius hercynicus
                          - Sisteronia seeleyi
                          - Platypterygius platydactylus
                          - Maiaspondylus lindoei
