= Macropterygius =

Macropterygius Temporal range: Late Jurassic, 150.8–145.5 Ma

Scientific classification
- Domain: Eukaryota
- Kingdom: Animalia
- Phylum: Chordata
- Class: Reptilia
- Order: †Ichthyosauria
- Family: †Ophthalmosauridae
- Genus: †Macropterygius; Huene, 1922 (nomen conservandum)
- Species: †M. trigonus

Binomial name
- †Macropterygius trigonus (Owen, 1840) (nomen conservandum)

Synonyms
- Ichthyosaurus trigonus Owen, 1840 (nomen conservandum)

Extinct genus of reptiles

Macropterygius is a genus of ichthyosaurs known from the Late Jurassic (Kimmeridgian age) of England (Kimmeridge Clay formation). Though many specimens have been referred to this genus from all over Europe, the type specimen of the only recognized species, M. trigonus, consists of just a single vertebra. Because this cannot be used to distinguish ichthyosaurs from one another, the genus and species are currently considered nomina dubia (doubtful names).

== Discovery and species ==
Originally described by Owen (1840) as a species of the genus Ichthyosaurus (I. trigonus). It has had an unstable taxonomic history, partly because the species was originally named without designating any particular specimen as the holotype. In 1889, the original type specimen of I. trigonus used by richard Owen was thought to be lost, and so Lydekker named several isolated vertebrae as the "type" of this species, though during this time there was no formal concept of a neotype. This created a problem, because the vertebrae selected by Lydekker came from unknown sediments and were not definitely associated with the original specimens named and described by Owen. Matters were complicated when the original holotype used by Owen was re-discovered, making the designation of a neotype unnecessary. This situation was not officially fixed until 1993, when the International Commission on Zoological Nomenclature formally declared that Lydekker's statement about the "type" did not count as designating a neotype, and so the designation did not need to be reversed in light of the holotype's re-discovery. The ICZN, in the same decision (Opinion 1734, Case 2779), added the genus Macropterygius and species M. trigonus (originally I. trigonus) to the list of generic and specific names, making both names nomina conservanda. The original holotype specimen is currently held by the Academy of Natural Sciences in Philadelphia, cataloged as specimen number ANSP 10124.

In 2000, Bardet and Fernández found that the holotype specimen of Macropterygius trigonus is undiagnosible beyond the level of Ophthalmosauridae, thus this genus and species were considered nomina dubia.

== See also ==
- List of ichthyosaurs
- Timeline of ichthyosaur research
