= Big Bend =

Big Bend generally refers to a major change in course or large meander in a river. It may refer to:

== Geographic locations ==
=== Canada ===
- Big Bend Country, the region around the northernmost section of the Columbia River in British Columbia
- Big Bend Peak, in the Canadian Rockies of Alberta
- Big Bend Ranges, a subrange of the Selkirk Mountains of the Columbia Mountains in southeastern British Columbia

=== United States ===
- Big Bend (Florida), an informally named geographic region of North Florida
- Big Bend Coast, part of the Florida coast on the Gulf of Mexico
- Big Bend (Texas), in western Texas north of the Rio Grande
- Big Bend (Colorado River, Utah), a meander
- Big Bend (Missouri River), a meander in South Dakota
- Big Bend of the Columbia River, a wide curve near Wenatchee, Washington

=== Elsewhere ===
- Big Bend, South Australia, of the Murray River

== Inhabited places ==
=== Canada ===
- Big Bend, British Columbia, now inundated by Kinbasket Lake
- Big Bend, Burnaby, a neighbourhood in Burnaby, British Columbia

=== United States ===
Listed alphabetically by state

- Big Bend, California, a census-designated place in Shasta County
  - Big Bend Rancheria, a settlement of the Pit River Tribe here
- Big Bend, Butte County, California, an unincorporated community
- Big Bend, Placer County, California, an unincorporated community
- Big Bend Township, Republic County, Kansas, a township
- Big Bend, Louisiana, an unincorporated community
- Big Bend City, Minnesota, an unincorporated community in Chippewa County
- Big Bend Township, Chippewa County, Minnesota, a township
- Big Bend, South Dakota, a community of the Crow Creek Indian Reservation
- Big Bend, West Virginia, an unincorporated community in Calhoun County
- Big Bend, Kanawha County, West Virginia, a census-designated place now known as Upper Falls, West Virginia
- Big Bend, Rusk County, Wisconsin, a town
- Big Bend, Waukesha County, Wisconsin, a village

=== Elsewhere ===
- Big Bend, Eswatini, a town in eastern Eswatini (Swaziland)

== Parks / protected areas ==
All in the United States

- Big Bend of the Colorado State Recreation Area, in Clark County, Nevada, near Bullhead City, Arizona
- Big Bend Historical Area, in western Pennsylvania at the Shenango River
- Big Bend National Park, located in Brewster County, Texas
- Big Bend Ranch State Park, west of Big Bend National Park, near the town of Presidio, Texas

== Schools ==
All in the United States

- Big Bend Community College, in Moses Lake, Washington
- Big Bend High School, in Terlingua, Texas
- Big Bend Rural School, a historic building in Crawford County, Missouri

== Species ==
- Big Bend gambusia, a rare species of fish found in Big Bend National Park in the U.S. state of Texas
- Big Bend slider, a species of turtle native to the Southwestern United States and northern Mexico

== Other uses ==
- The Big Bend, a proposed residential skyscraper in New York City
- Big Bend Dam, on the Missouri River in South Dakota, United States
- Big Bend Gold Rush of the 1860s in British Columbia, Canada
- Big Bend Highway, in British Columbia, Canada
- Big Bend Power Station, near Tampa, Florida, United States
- Big Bend Water District, a government agency in the U.S. state of Nevada
