= Big Bend, Minnesota =

Big Bend, Minnesota, may refer to:

- Big Bend City, Minnesota, an unincorporated community in Chippewa County
- Big Bend Township, Chippewa County, Minnesota, a township

== See also ==
- Big Bend (disambiguation)
