= Elgin Schoolhouse State Historic Site =

Historic one-room schoolhouse in Nevada

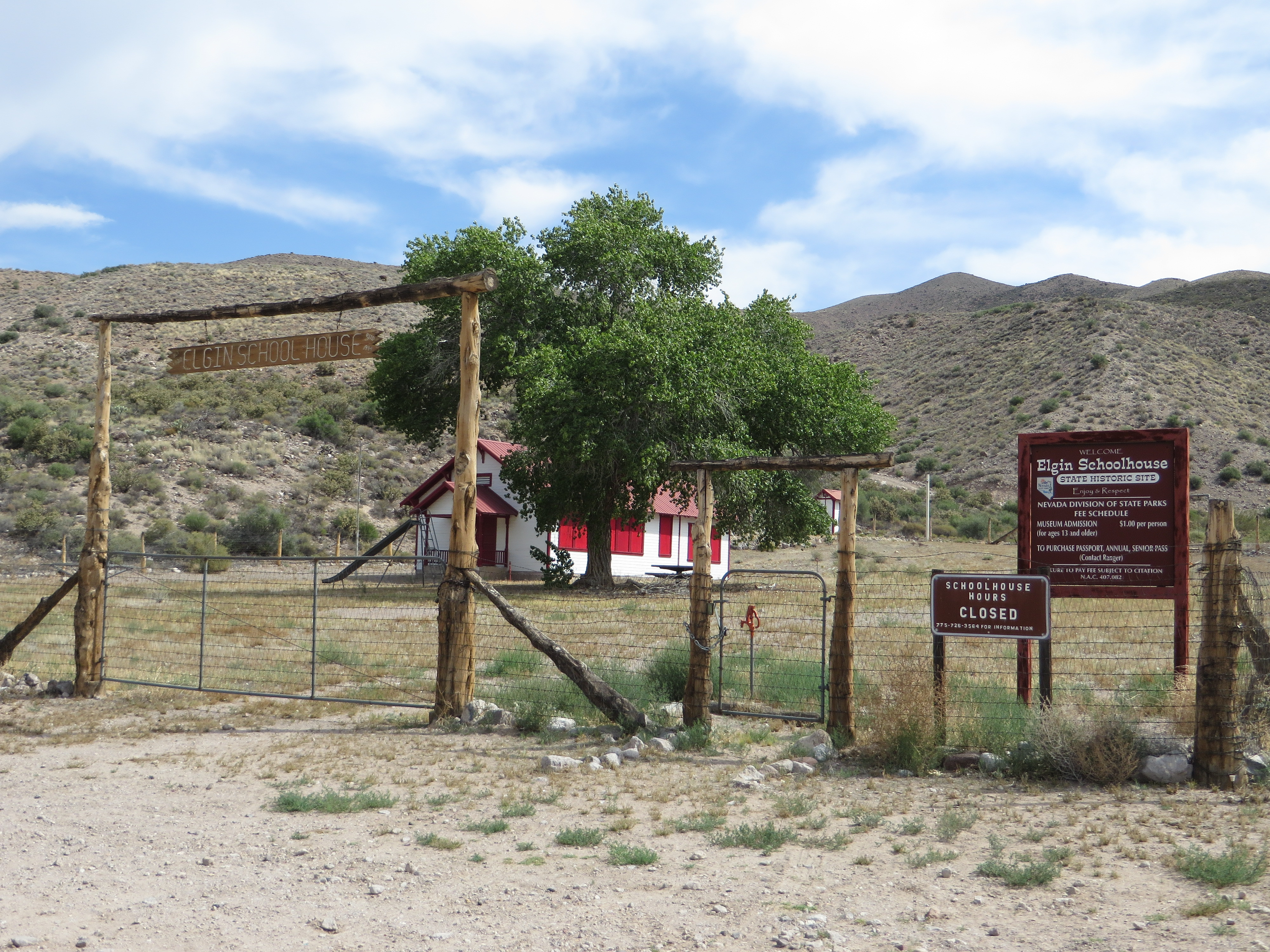

- Location within Nevada
- Location: Lincoln County, Nevada, United States
- Nearest city: Caliente, Nevada
- Coordinates: 37°21′09″N 114°32′04″W
- Area: 1.81 acres (0.73 ha)
- Elevation: 3,402 ft (1,037 m)
- Established: 2005
- Administrator: Nevada Division of State Parks
- Designation: Nevada state park
- Website: Official website

Elgin Schoolhouse State Historic Site is a state park property in the ghost town of Elgin, Nevada, United States, preserving a historic one-room schoolhouse that operated from 1922 to 1967.

== History ==
Rancher James Bradshaw donated seven acres of land for the school in 1921 after Lincoln County approved funding for its construction. His son Rueben Bradshaw built the schoolhouse, which was completed in 1922. A small addition was completed two years later to provide living quarters for the teacher. The school closed in 1967 when its last student reached 8th grade. Local children were subsequently transported by bus to schools in Caliente and Panaca.

In 1998, the building was restored at private expense to its original appearance. In July 2005, it became a state historic site. Later that year, floods damaged Nevada State Route 317, restricting access to the site. The park features half of the school's original furnishings and other items authentic to the time period. It is open for tours by appointment.
