= Big Bend State Park =

Big Bend State Park may refer to:

- Big Bend Ranch State Park, Texas
- The former name for Big Bend National Park, Texas
- Big Bend of the Colorado State Recreation Area, Nevada

== See also ==
- Big Bend (disambiguation)#Parks
