= Rainbow Canyon =

Rainbow Canyon may refer to:

== Places ==
- Rainbow Canyon (Nevada), a canyon located in Lincoln County, Nevada
- Rainbow Canyon (California), a canyon near the western edge of Death Valley National Park in Inyo County, California
- Rainbow Canyon (British Columbia), a small canyon on the Moose River
- Rainbow Canyon Rehabilitation Center
