= Elgin, Nevada =

- Ghost town
- Location within Nevada Location within the United States
- Coordinates: 37°21′07″N 114°32′09″W
- Country: United States
- State: Nevada
- County: Lincoln
- Elevation: 3,410 ft (1,040 m)
- Time zone: UTC-8 (Pacific (PST))
  - Summer (DST): UTC-7 (PDT)

Elgin /ˈɛldʒɪn/ is a ghost town located between Caliente and Carp, Nevada on the eastern banks of the Meadow Valley Wash off of Nevada State Route 317.

The first settlement at Elgin was made in 1882. A post office was established at Elgin in 1913, and remained in operation until 1966.

The population was 60 in 1940.

A former railroad town, it is now the location of the Elgin Schoolhouse State Historic Site, a one-room schoolhouse museum which is open by appointment. There is an apple orchard nearby.
