= Beaver Dam State Park (Nevada) =

State park in Nevada, United States

- Location within Nevada
- Interactive map of Beaver Dam State Park
- Location: Lincoln County, Nevada, United States
- Nearest city: Caliente, Nevada
- Coordinates: 37°31′23″N 114°05′35″W
- Area: 2,182.24 acres (883.12 ha)
- Elevation: 5,197 ft (1,584 m)
- Established: 1935
- Administrator: Nevada Division of State Parks
- Visitors: 618 vehicles (in 2017)
- Designation: Nevada state park
- Website: Official website

Beaver Dam State Park is a public recreation area encompassing more than 2,000 acres (810 ha) along Beaver Dam Wash in Lincoln County, Nevada. The state park is on the Nevada/Utah state line about 25 miles (40 km) east of the town of Caliente.

== History ==
Beaver Dam State Park was among the first four state parks established when the state park system was created by the Nevada Legislature in 1935. The Civilian Conservation Corps was active from 1934 to 1936 building camping and picnicking areas that were destroyed by floods later in the 1930s. Schroeder Reservoir was created with the construction of an earthen dam in 1961. After Schroeder Lake was washed out by flood in 2005, the reservoir was not rebuilt. In 2009, the reservoir was drained and Beaver Dam Wash was restored to its natural state.

== Activities and amenities ==
The park has picnicking facilities, campgrounds, trout fishing in beaver ponds and streams, and hiking trails. The Overlook Trail offers a 360° view of the park.
