= Big Bend of the Columbia River =

The term Big Bend of the Columbia River has two different usages:

- In Canada, it refers to the northward arc of the Columbia River through a region hence known as the Big Bend Country
- in the United States, it refers to the wide curve in the Columbia River's course as it bends south then southeast in the area of Wenatchee, Washington.

== See also ==
- Big Bend (disambiguation)
