= Cathedral Gorge State Park =

State park in Nevada, United States

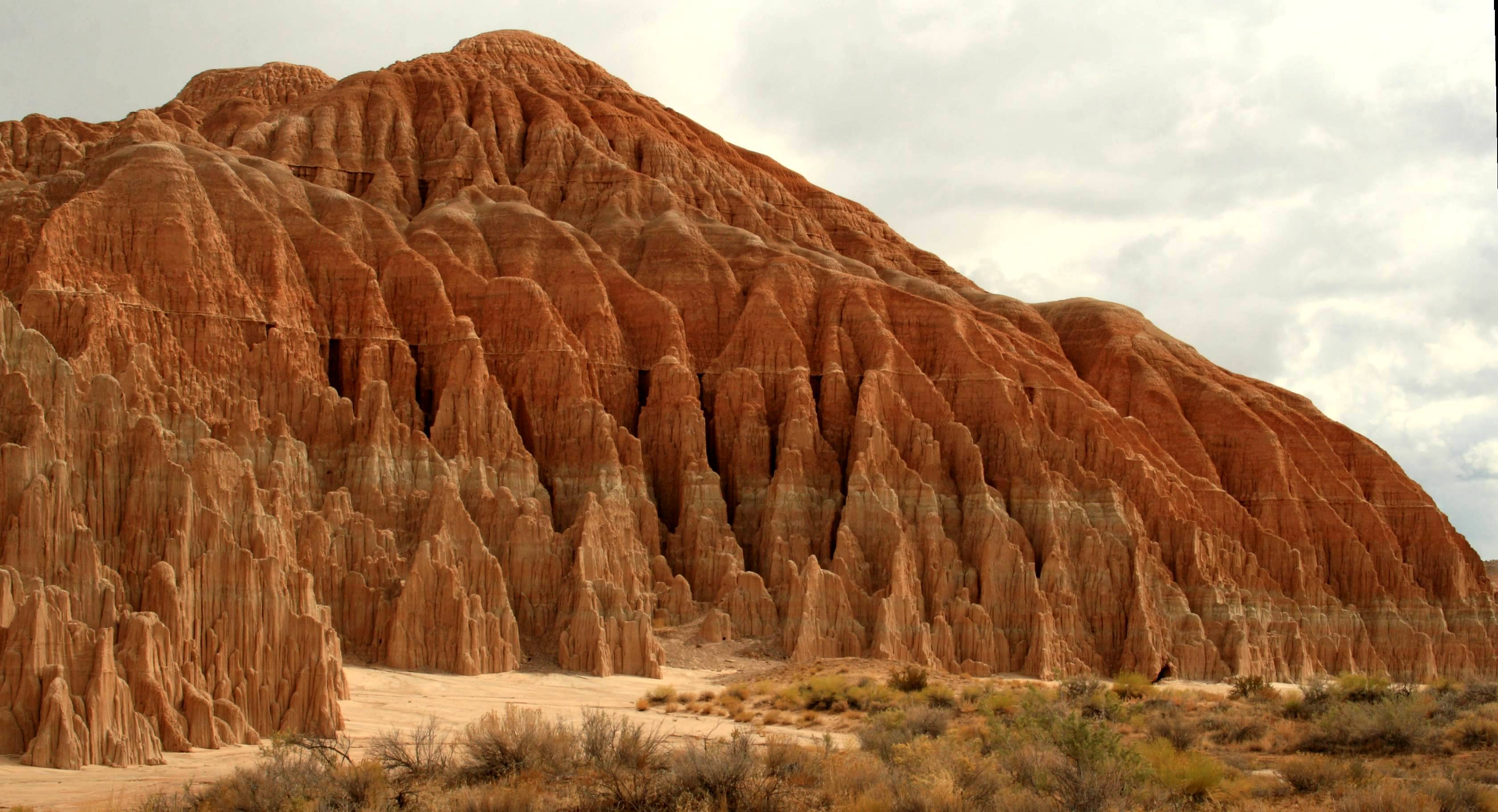
- Columns and spires eroded into a bentonite formation

- Location within Nevada
- Location: Lincoln County, Nevada, United States
- Nearest town: Panaca, Nevada
- Coordinates: 37°48′10″N 114°24′43″W
- Area: 1,792.24 acres (725.29 ha)
- Elevation: 4,761 ft (1,451 m)
- Established: 1935
- Administrator: Nevada Division of State Parks
- Visitors: 11,524 vehicles (in 2017)
- Designation: Nevada state park
- Website: Official website

Cathedral Gorge State Park is a public recreation area and geologic preserve featuring a dramatic landscape of eroded soft bentonite clay covering almost 1,800 acres (730 ha) in Lincoln County, Nevada. The state park is located along U.S. Route 93 at the west end of State Route 319, two miles (3.2 km) northwest of the town of Panaca.

== History ==
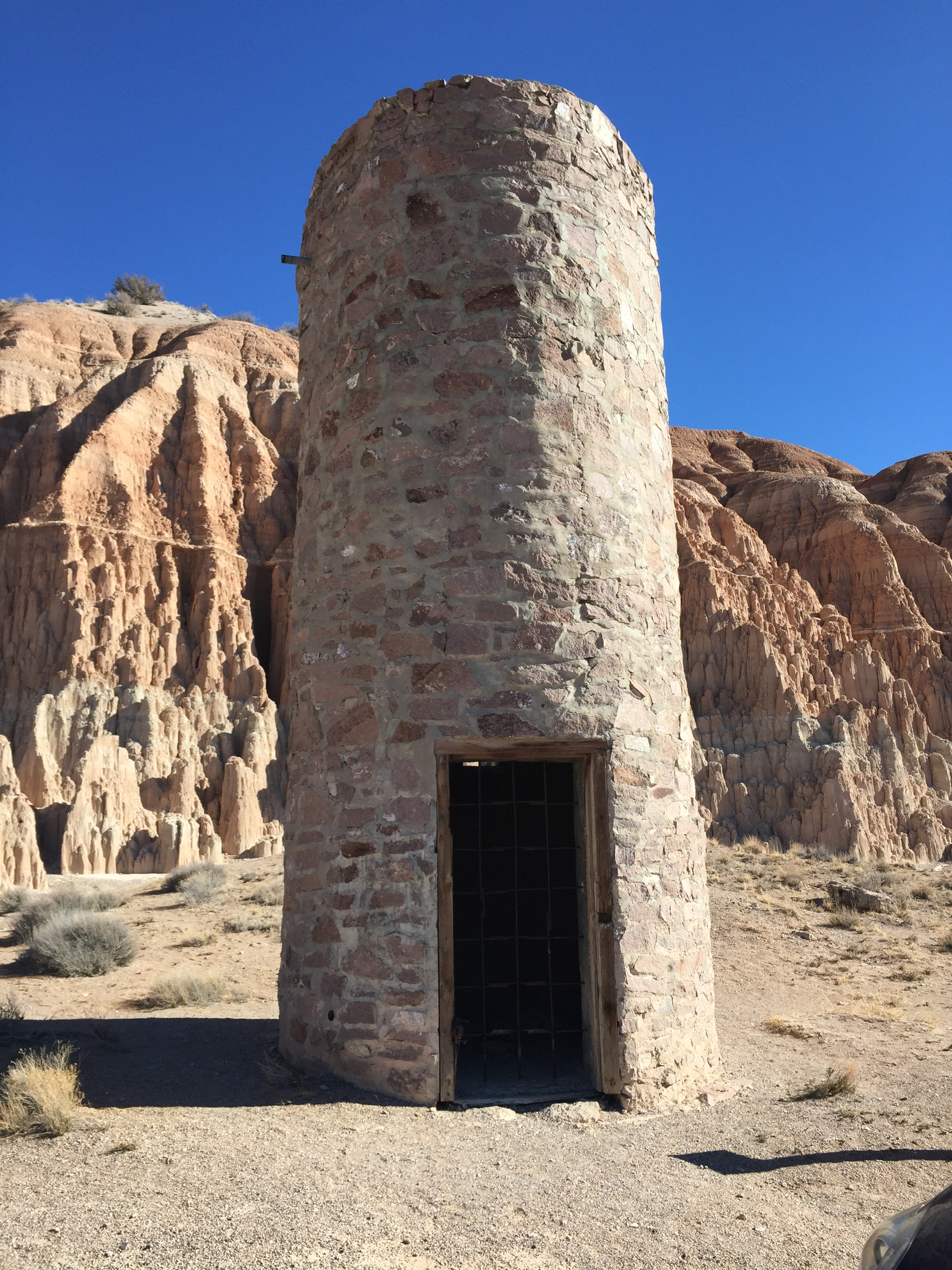
The CCC's water tower

The site has been popular with local picnickers since the nineteenth century, when it was known as Cathedral Gulch. During the 1920s, its dramatic landscape provided a background for open-air plays and annual Easter ceremonies. Governor James Scrugham began acquiring and setting aside the area for preservation in 1924. It subsequently became one of the four original Nevada state parks created in 1935. Members of the Civilian Conservation Corps built picnicking facilities that are still in use as well as a stone water tower and stone restroom which are no longer in operation.

== Natural features ==
=== Climate ===
The park lies at about 4,760 feet (1,450 m) above sea level. The climate is arid, with hot summers and cold winters; summer temperatures typically reach about 95 °F (35 °C) by day and fall to about 55 °F (13 °C) at night. Rainfall is variable, and thunderstorms are common.

=== Geology ===
Most of Meadow Valley, which lies along U.S. Route 93 between Caliente and Panaca, was covered by a freshwater lake about 5 million years ago during the Pliocene epoch. The richly colored canyons of Cathedral Gorge (called the Panaca Formation) are remnants of this ancient lakebed. The lake drained gradually over a very long period. Erosion began working away at the exposed portions of sediment and gravel that once composed the lake bottom. Rainwater and melting snow carved rivulets in the soft siltstone and clay shale, splitting tiny cracks and fissures into larger and larger gullies and canyons.

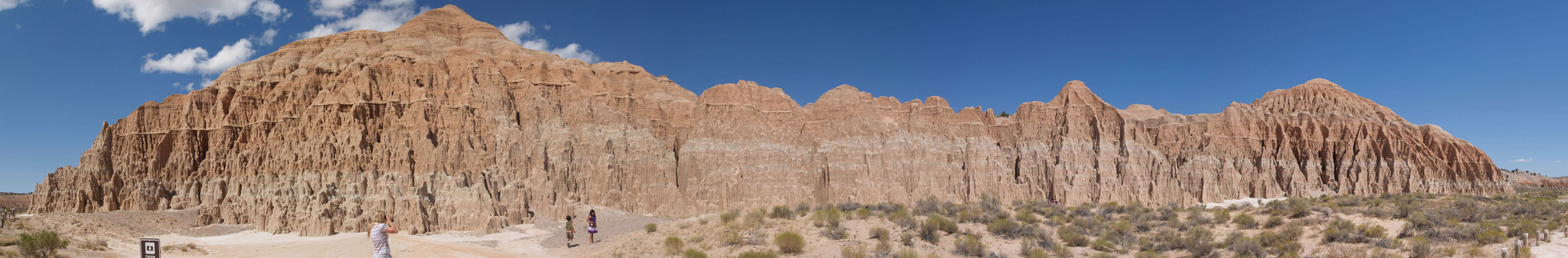
Cathedral Gorge panorama in the Canyon Caves area

=== Plants ===
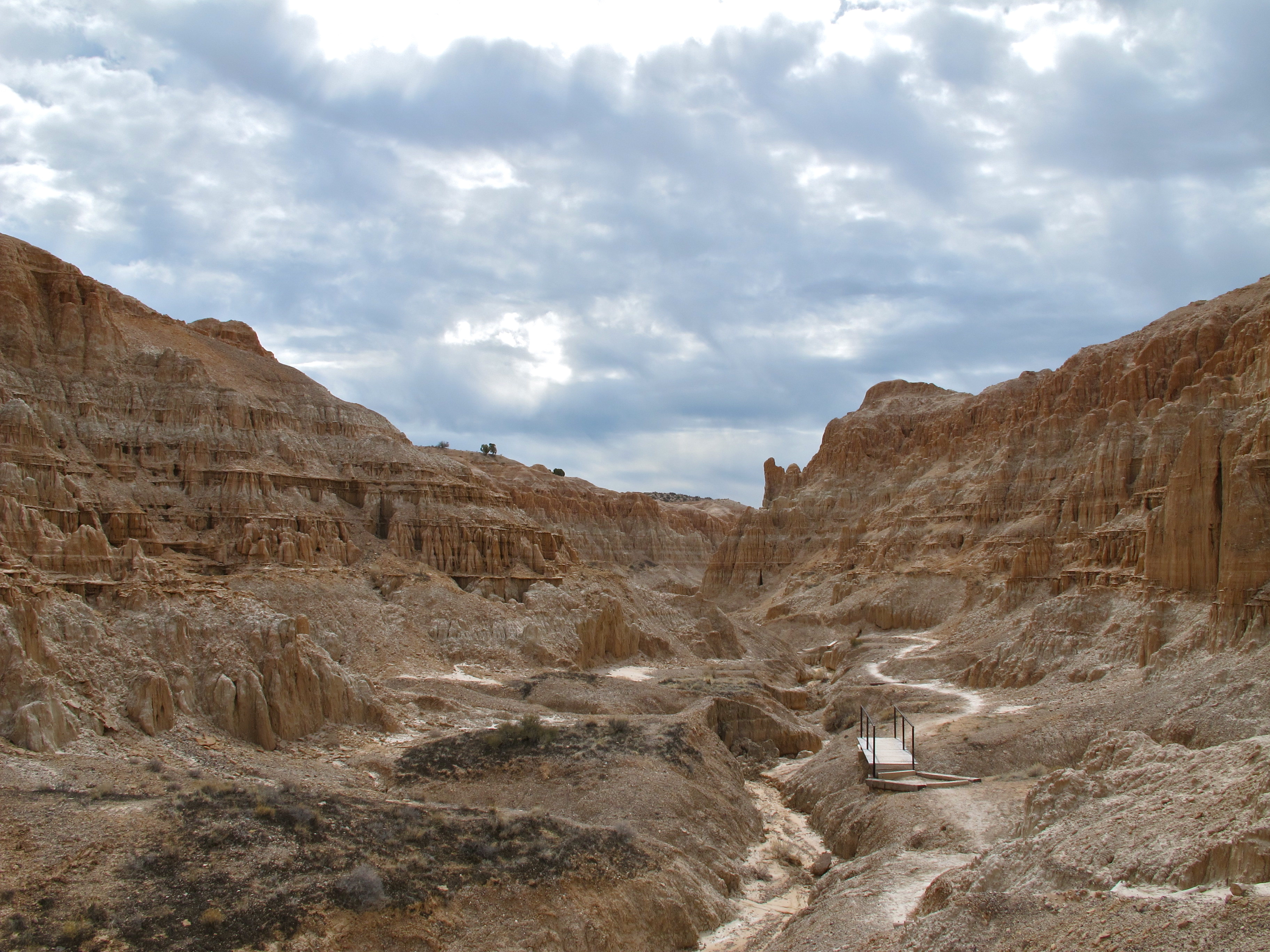
Trail Winding Through Cathedral Gorge State Park

In areas below the eroded escarpment (dubbed the "Badland") it is difficult for plant life to take root in the constantly eroding clay. However, away from the clay, the park's diverse soil types allow various plant associations to grow. Fragile sand dunes are held firm thanks to a wide array of wildflowers and grasses, such as dune primroses and Indian ricegrass. Within the valley center, clay, sand, and gravel have melded to form a rich soil supporting narrowleaf yucca, juniper, barberry, sagebrush, greasewood, white sage, shadscale and four-winged saltbush. Rabbitbrush finds sanctuary in disturbed areas, such as roadsides and walkways. Very few species of cactus can tolerate the climate in Cathedral Gorge, where temperatures in winter can fall below freezing, and rise above 100 °F (38 °C) in summer. Other trees, not native to the park, have been planted around the campground to provide shade.

=== Animals ===
Small mammals form a majority of the park's animal population: black-tailed jackrabbits, cottontail rabbits, coyotes, gophers, kangaroo rats, kit foxes, mice, and skunks. Deer can be observed infrequently near Miller Point during the late fall and winter. Birds are seen frequently around camp areas and near dense patches of shrubs. The natives include blackbirds, black-throated sparrows, finches, American kestrels, small hawks, ravens, roadrunners, American robins, sapsuckers, and introduced European starlings. Migratory birds include bluebirds, cedar waxwings, hummingbirds, and warblers. Various species of non-venomous snakes and lizards are abundant. In the summer, the Great Basin rattlesnake may be spotted.

== Activities and amenities ==
Known locally as "caves", the park's narrow slot canyons were cut from the mud that lay at the bottom of the lake millions of years ago. Explorers can crawl through tunnels to discover hidden chambers in the network of canyons which offer some coolness in the summer heat.

Park trails
| Trail | Length (one-way, unless loop) | Notes |
|---|---|---|
| Bullionville Trail | 0.2 miles (0.3 km) | Easy walk from visitor center to Bullionville Cemetery |
| Nature Loop | 0.5 miles (0.8 km) | Leads from campground to slot canyons in the day-use area, crossing two washes; interpretive nature signs |
| Juniper Draw Loop | 3 miles (4.8 km) | Flat, sandy loop following formations around the valley floor |
| Miller Point Trail | 1 mile (1.6 km) | Moderate canyon trail with stairs to Miller Point |
| Eagle Point Trail | 0.8 miles (1.3 km) | Follows a ridge line to a bird's-eye view of the entire park |
| New Ridge-line Trail | 4.2 miles (6.8 km) | Splits from the Juniper Draw Trail, winds through formations, then follows the ridge-line around the park |

Park facilities include a 22-site campground, ADA-accessible sites, group use area, restrooms and showers. A regional visitor center at the park entrance has interpretive displays and information about other parks in the area.
