= Kershaw–Ryan State Park =

State park in Nevada, United States

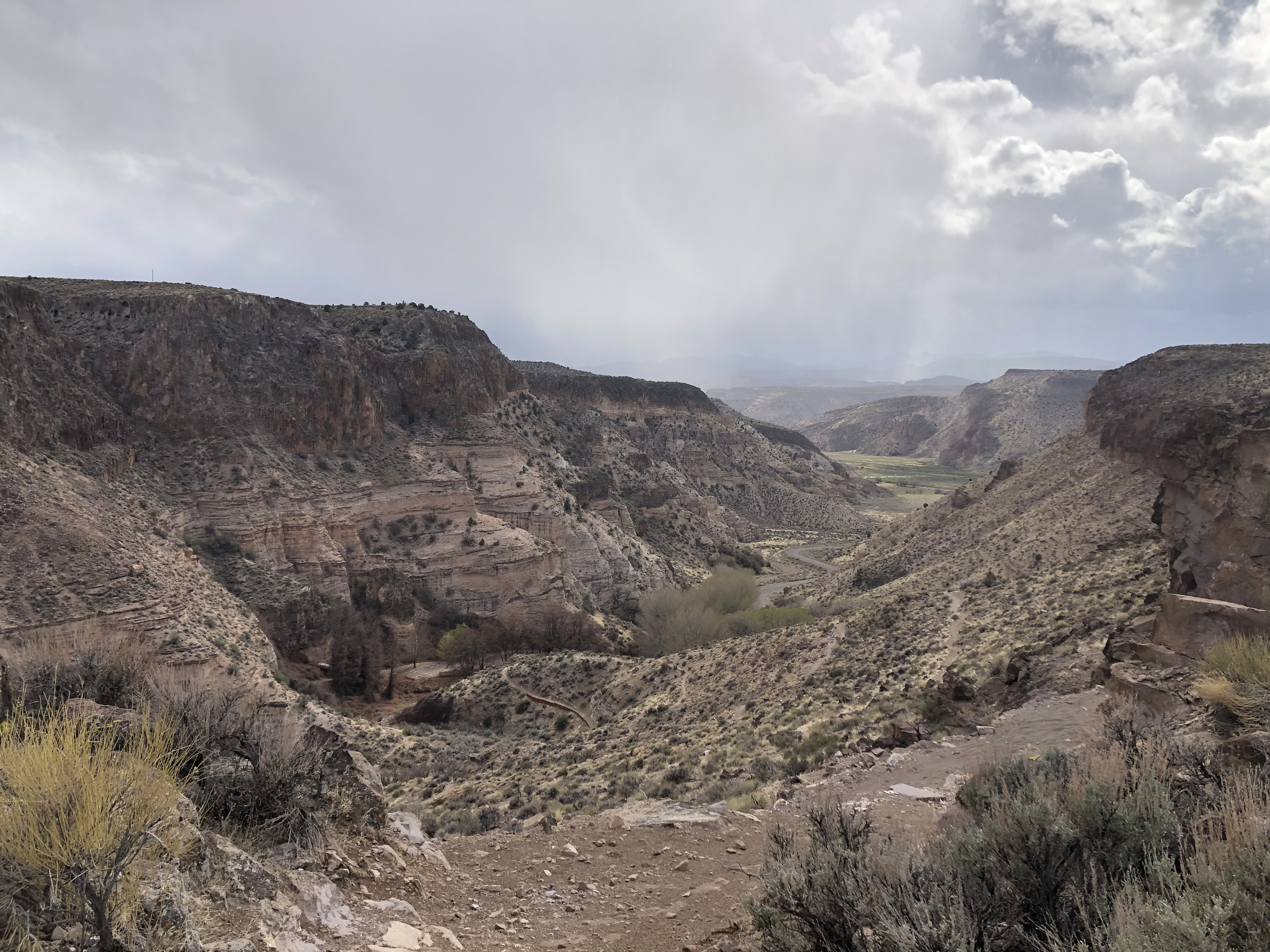
- Canyon view

- Location within Nevada
- Location: Lincoln County, Nevada, United States
- Nearest city: Caliente, Nevada
- Coordinates: 37°35′22″N 114°31′13″W
- Area: 264.74 acres (107.14 ha)
- Elevation: 4,515 ft (1,376 m)
- Established: 1935
- Administrator: Nevada Division of State Parks
- Visitors: 3,539 vehicles (in 2017)
- Designation: Nevada state park
- Website: Official website

Kershaw–Ryan State Park is a public recreation area on Nevada State Route 317, two miles (3.2 km) south of the town of Caliente, Nevada, United States. The state park covers 265 acres (107 ha) at the northern end of Rainbow Canyon in an area that was homesteaded in 1873.

== History ==
The canyon was settled in 1873 by Samuel and Hannah Kershaw, who operated a ranch called the Meadow Valley Wash Ranch. In 1904, they sold the property to rancher James Ryan, who donated the land to the state in 1926 to be a public park. The Civilian Conservation Corps developed visitor amenities in 1934, and Kershaw–Ryan State Park was officially established as one of Nevada's first four state parks the following year. A flash flood in 1984 destroyed most of the park's facilities, including the stone caretaker's cabin built by the CCC. After rebuilding and redesign, the park reopened in 1997. The trail system was expanded by 3.28 miles (5.28 km) by the Great Basin Institute between August 2018 and late 2019.

== Activities and amenities ==
The park offers camping, picnicking, and a group-use area. Hikers can explore the 1.5-mile (2.4 km) Canyon Overlook Trail and shorter Rattlesnake Loop.
