= Caliente station =

Former train station in Caliente, Nevada, United States

Caliente, NV
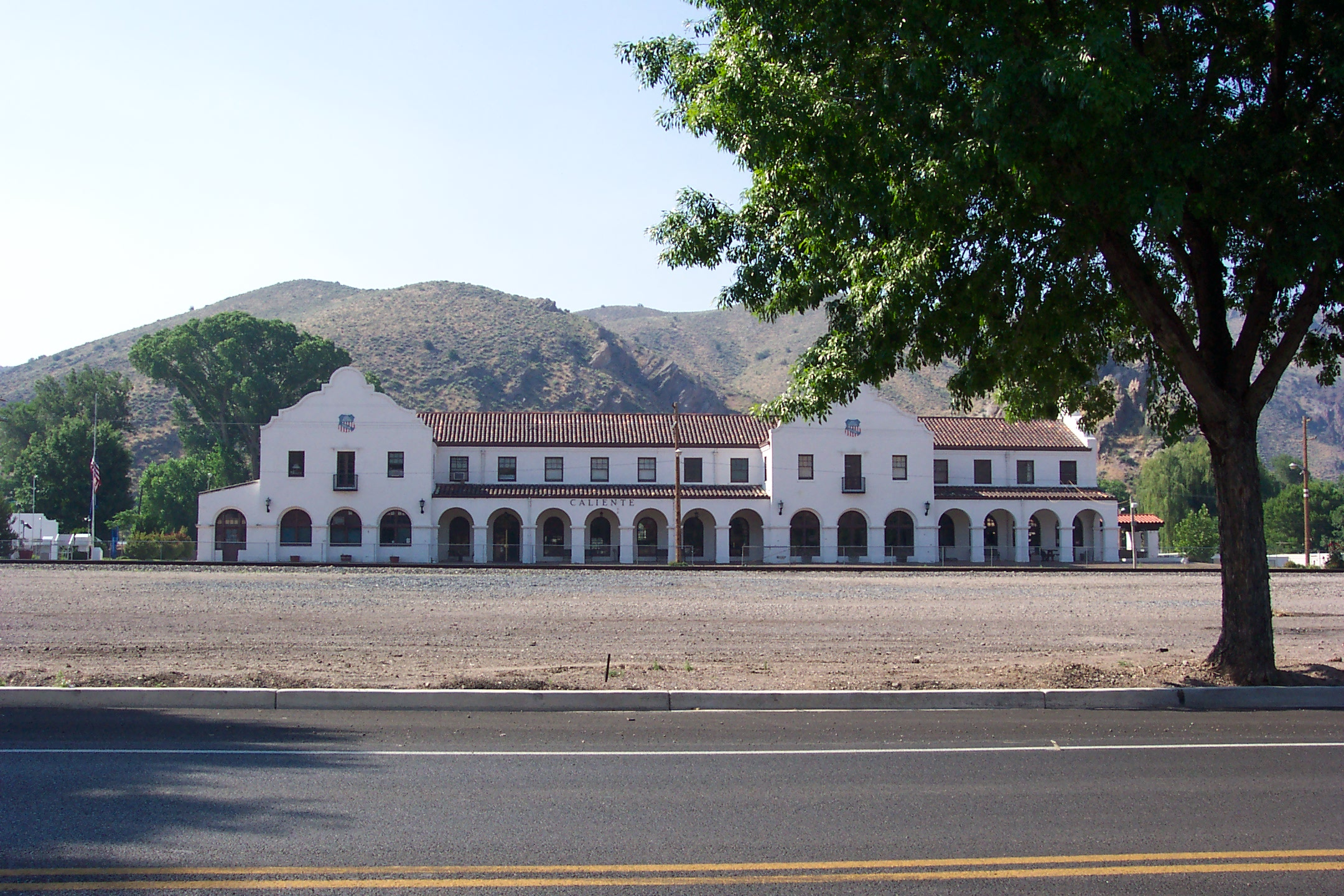
- The former Caliente station, January 2007

General information
- Location: 100 Depot Avenue; Caliente, Nevada; United States
- System: inter-city rail station
- Owner: Caliente City
- Line: Caliente Subdivision
- Platforms: None remaining
- Tracks: 2
- Connections: 37°36′46″N 114°30′51″W

History
- Opened: 1923
- Closed: 1997

Former services
Preceding station	Amtrak	Following station
Las Vegas toward Los Angeles	Desert Wind	Milford toward Chicago
Preceding station	Union Pacific Railroad	Following station
Etna toward Los Angeles	Los Angeles and Salt Lake Railroad	Eccles toward Salt Lake City
Panaca toward Pioche	Pioche – Caliente	Terminus
- Caliente Railroad Depot
- U.S. National Register of Historic Places
- Nevada Historical Marker No. 249
- Location: 100 Depot Avenue; Caliente, Nevada
- Coordinates: 37°36′46″N 114°30′51″W
- Built: 1923
- Architect: John and Donald Parkinson
- Architectural style: Mission Revival
- NRHP reference No.: 74001146
- Marker No.: 249
- Added to NRHP: March 5, 1974
Location

Caliente station is a historic Mission Revival style railway station, located in Caliente, Nevada, United States. The station is listed on the National Register of Historic Places as the Caliente Railroad Depot, and is Nevada Historical Marker number 249.

== History ==
The station was built by the Los Angeles and Salt Lake Railroad (later the Union Pacific Railroad) in 1923 to serve the railroad's division point on the mainline between Los Angeles, California, and Salt Lake City, Utah.

The depot is a two-story wood frame stucco building. The first floor held the passenger waiting room, station agent's office and other railroad offices. The second floor was used as a hotel.

The division point at Caliente served as a maintenance facility and was a base for helper locomotives. In the 1950s, as diesel locomotives replaced steam, the railroad no longer needed to use the Caliente site. Maintenance of the locomotives was moved to Las Vegas in 1948.

Until 1997, the station saw service on Amtrak's Desert Wind.

== Present day ==
In 1970, the building was turned over to the city of Caliente. In order to preserve the depot structure, the city moved its municipal services into the building. The station is now the Caliente city hall, library, and art gallery.

== See also ==
- National Register of Historic Places listings in Lincoln County, Nevada
- William A. Clark
- Kelso Depot, Restaurant and Employees Hotel
