= Echo Canyon State Park =

State park in Nevada, United States

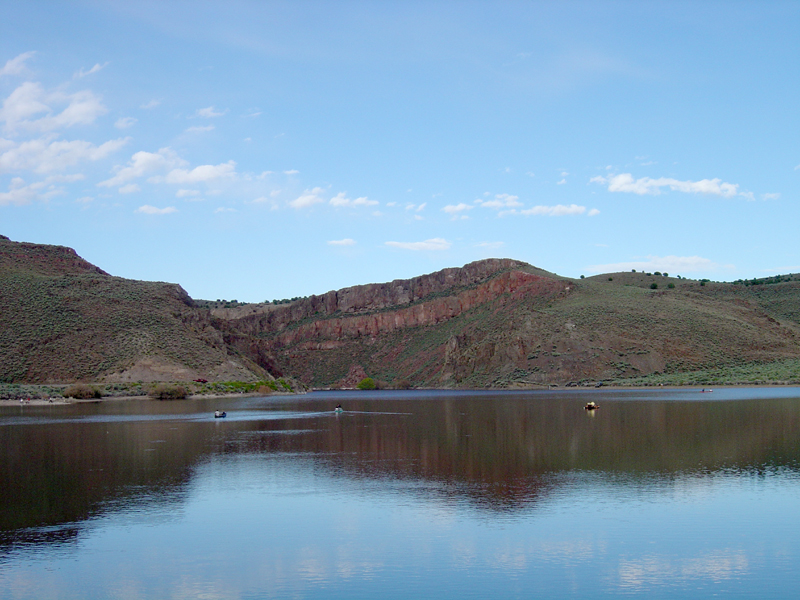
- Echo Canyon Reservoir

- Location within Nevada
- Location: Lincoln County, Nevada, United States
- Nearest town: Pioche, Nevada
- Coordinates: 37°54′29″N 114°16′3″W
- Area: 1,055.27 acres (427.05 ha)
- Elevation: 5,266 ft (1,605 m)
- Established: 1970
- Administrator: Nevada Division of State Parks
- Visitors: 17,536 vehicles (in 2017)
- Designation: Nevada state park
- Website: Official website

Echo Canyon State Park is a public recreation area located about twelve miles (19 km) east of the town of Pioche, Nevada, United States. The state park surrounds the seventy-acre (28 ha) Echo Canyon Reservoir. The scenic area around Echo Canyon has several ranches and farms. The park ranges in elevation from 5,200 feet (1,600 m) to 5,600 feet (1,700 m) and sees occasional winter snows.

== History ==
The reservoir was created with the building in 1969–70 of the Echo Canyon Dam in the Meadow Valley Wash approximately ten miles downstream from Eagle Valley Reservoir. It is also a historical site along the Mormon trail. Following development of a camping area, the Nevada Division of State Parks took control of operations in 1970.

== Activities and amenities ==
The park offers campsites, picnicking, boat launch, and fishing. The 2.5-mile (4.0 km) Ash Canyon hiking trail leads into backcountry areas of the park.
