= Dayton State Park =

State park in Nevada, United States

- Location within Nevada
- Interactive map of Dayton State Park
- Location: Dayton, Nevada, United States
- Coordinates: 39°14′55″N 119°35′20″W
- Area: 151.8 acres (61.4 ha)
- Elevation: 4,360 ft (1,330 m)
- Established: 1977
- Administrator: Nevada Division of State Parks
- Visitors: 5,286 vehicles (in 2017)
- Designation: Nevada state park
- Website: Official website

Dayton State Park is a 152-acre (62 ha) public recreation area in the town of Dayton, Nevada, USA. The state park preserves the site of the Rock Point Stamp Mill, which was built in 1861 to process silver ore mined from the Comstock Lode.

== Features ==
The park is separated into distinct upper and lower sections by U.S. Route 50, which runs through the center of the park.

Lower park

The park's main entrance is in the "lower" or eastern portion which preserves a section of woodlands along the Carson River. In 1997, the valley flooded and permanently changed the course of the river, which now runs significantly farther to the east than it once did. The now dry, former riverbed can be seen. Nature trails along the ever-changing Carson River provide for bird and wildlife viewing. Day-use and group picnic areas and a 10-site campground are also located here.

Upper park

The "upper" or western section of the park can be accessed through a pedestrian tunnel that runs beneath U.S. 50 to the Rock Point mill ruins. The Rock Point Stamp Mill was built in 1861 to process ore from Silver City and Virginia City. Wooden flumes (the remains of which are also visible) provided the necessary water for the milling process from the nearby Carson River. Rock Point was one of the largest processing mills along the Carson River.

After the mill was dismantled and moved to Silver City in the 1920s, the area was used as the town garbage dump for 30 years. The ruins of the mill include a concrete water storage tank, a reservoir and head-gage, stamp battery footings, building foundations, rock retaining walls, waterways, and “hermits cave.” Remnants of the garbage dump are visible, as is a section of the old U.S. 50. The property was deeded to the state in 1954 to be managed by the Nevada Department of Transportation. It was officially established as a state park in 1977 and opened to the public in 1979.

== Activities and amenities ==
The park offers a 10-site campground, picnicking areas, and nature trails.
