= Walker River State Recreation Area =

Park in Nevada, United States

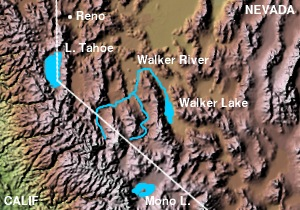
- Map of Walker River

- Location within Nevada
- Location: Lyon and Mineral counties, Nevada, United States
- Nearest city: Yerington, Nevada
- Coordinates: 38°51′01″N 119°05′08″W
- Area: 12,312.18 acres (4,982.56 ha)
- Established: 2018
- Administrator: Nevada Division of State Parks
- Designation: Nevada state park
- Website: Official website

Walker River State Recreation Area is a 12,300-acre (5,000 ha) state park unit of Nevada along the East Walker River near the city of Yerington. The park is one of Nevada's largest and newest state park units, dedicated by Governor Brian Sandoval on September 18, 2018. The park is composed of four units consisting of historical ranch land. The land was officially reconveyed to the state in 2017 by the Walker Basin Conservancy, a nonprofit dedicated to the restoration of Walker Lake while protecting environmental, agricultural and recreational interests. The Walker Basin Conservancy purchased the water rights and accompanying land for the benefit of Walker Lake. The Walker Basin Conservancy will maintain stewardship activities on the land.

Unit	Size	Notes
Pitchfork Ranch	2,320 acres	Features visitor center, park headquarters, kayaking training pond
Nine Mile Ranch	-	Nicknamed "the Elbow", undeveloped
Rafter 7 Ranch	3,223 acres	Not yet open to public
Flying M Ranch	7,313 acres	Not yet open to public, currently under private ownership
