= Van Sickle Bi-State Park =

State park in California and Nevada, United States

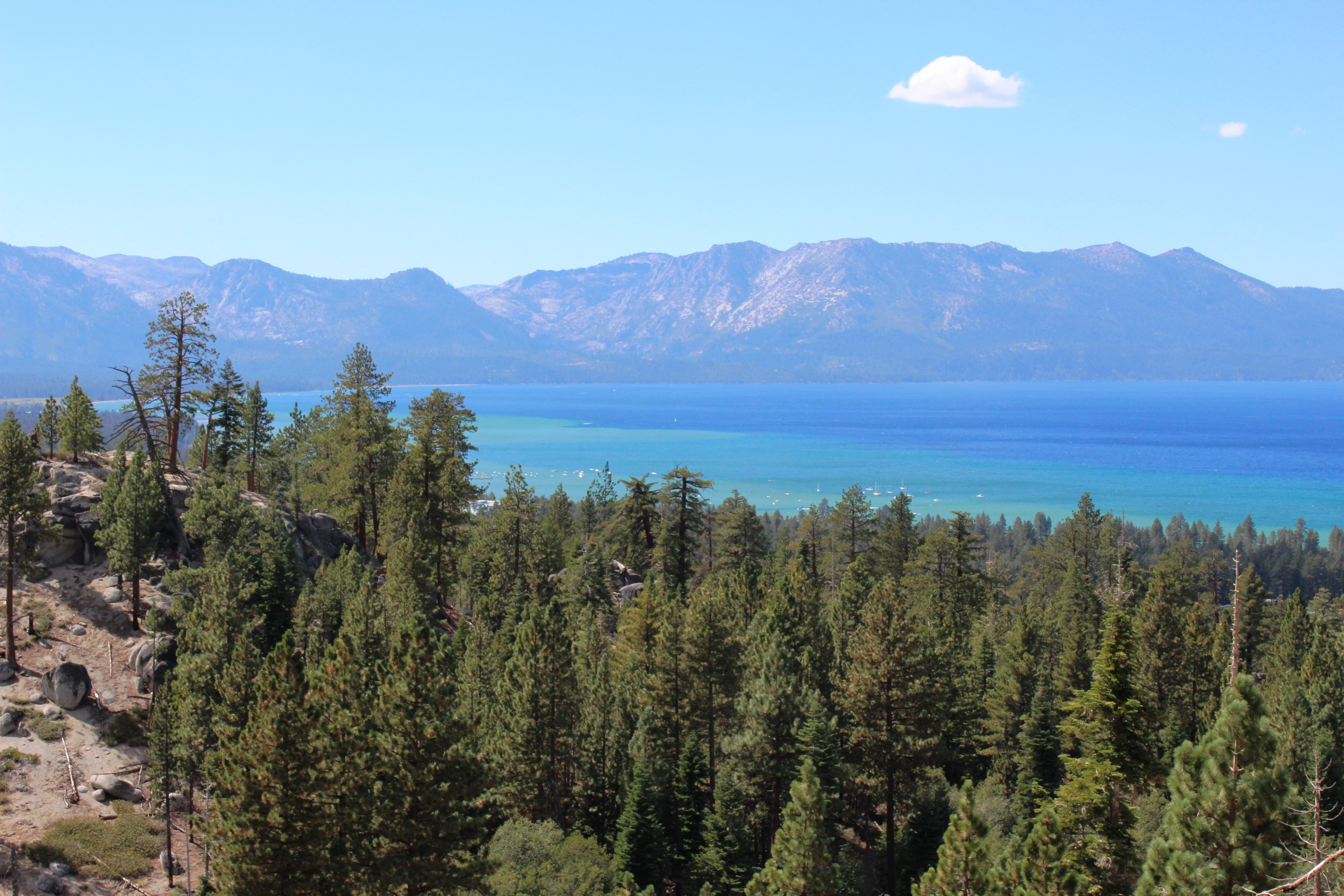
- View of Lake Tahoe from Van Sickle Bi-State Park, September 2012

- Location within Nevada
- Location: Douglas County, Nevada & El Dorado County, California, (United States)
- Nearest city: South Lake Tahoe, California
- Coordinates: 38°57′17″N 119°56′26″W
- Area: 725 acres (293 ha)
- Elevation: 6,283 ft (1,915 m)
- Established: 1988
- Administrator: Nevada Division of State Parks, California Tahoe Conservancy
- Designation: Nevada state park
- Named for: Henry Van Sickle
- Website: Official website

Van Sickle Bi-State Park is a public recreation area straddling the border of California and Nevada (Western United States), that overlooks Lake Tahoe (shared by both states) and preserves the memory of Henry Van Sickle, a key member in the founding of the town of Genoa, Nevada and the surrounding area. The state park features trails for hiking, mountain biking, and horseback riding. It is managed by the Nevada Division of State Parks in partnership with the California Tahoe Conservancy.

== History ==
Henry Van Sickle came to the Carson Valley in 1852, where he erected a hotel, restaurant, blacksmith shop, and bar while also being the first toll officer of the Kingsbury grade toll road. Jack Van Sickle, Henry's grandson, purchased a large portion of the Van Sickle Bi-State Park property at Lake Tahoe from Cora B. Harding in the late 1940s. Jack and his wife, Beth Van Sickle, harvested thousands of Christmas trees while operating the popular Stateline Stables. The property was also the home to the area's only rodeo grounds, where a local horse trader hosted events. From the 1950s until 1993, the equestrian stable for tourists, Stateline Stables, operated on the site with 40 to 60 horses taking riders on trails throughout the scenic area. The Lake Tahoe property was owned by Jack Van Sickle when, in 1988, 542 acres (219 ha) of the land was donated to the Nevada Division of State Parks. In 2001, the California Tahoe Conservancy purchased his adjacent California property. The park opened to the public in 2011. The pre-1870 historic barn, which originally sat alongside Highway 50, was relocated around 1960 to its present location near the Van Sickle homesite and is now included and to be preserved in the Van Sickle Bi-State Park system.

While the California Department of Parks and Recreation was initially involved, the organization dropped out due to continued funding woes. Although part of the park is in California, it is not considered a California state park.

== Park ==
The park encompasses 575 acres (233 ha) within Nevada and 150 acres (61 ha) in California. The main entrance as well as most of the historical buildings are on the California side. The Heavenly Ski Resort gondola runs over the park grounds near the barn and stables. Features of the park include the historic 1870 Van Sickle farm barn, a 1917-era log cabin, and hiking trails with access to the Tahoe Rim Trail.
