= Etna, Lincoln County, Nevada =

Etna, Nevada
- Ghost town
- Location within Nevada Location within the United States
- Coordinates: 37°11′20″N 115°44′07″W
- Country: United States
- State: Nevada
- County: Lincoln
- Elevation: 4,229 ft (1,289 m)

Etna is a former railroad station in Lincoln County, in the U.S. state of Nevada.

In 1941, Etna had 14 inhabitants who were the owners of the nearby Tennille ranch. The last occupants of Etna left in the late 1970s. The residence was demolished in the early 1990s.

Etna Cave, which contains rock art, is located nearby.

The site is of Etna is just north of the present day Narconon Rainbow Canyon Retreat on Nevada State Route 317.
