= List of Nevada state parks =

Map of Nevada state parks (blue), state recreation areas (green), and state historic sites (red).

This list of Nevada state parks comprises protected areas managed by the U.S. state of Nevada, which include state parks, state historic sites, and state recreation areas. The system is managed by the Nevada Division of State Parks within the Nevada Department of Conservation and Natural Resources. The Division of State Parks was created by an act of the Nevada Legislature in 1963. The system manages 23 state park units, some of which have multiple units. The Division is headquartered in Carson City and has two management regions statewide: the Northern Region (Fallon Office) and the Southern Region (Las Vegas Office).

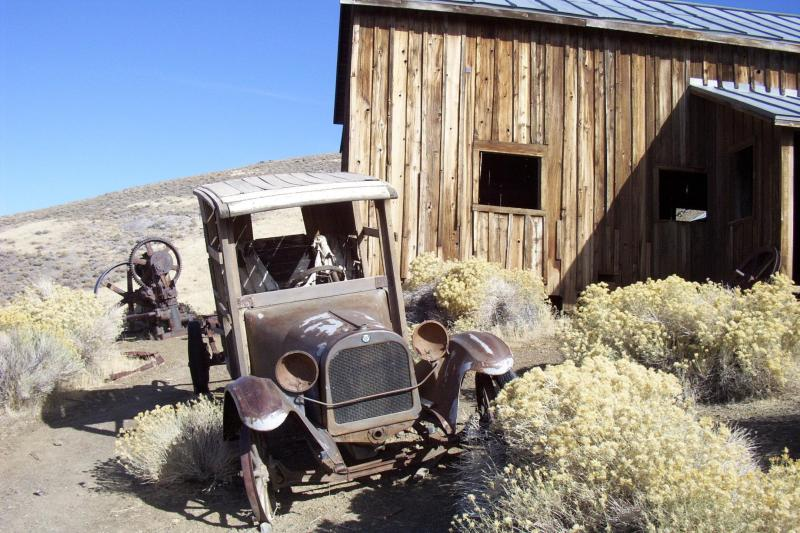
Berlin–Ichthyosaur State Park

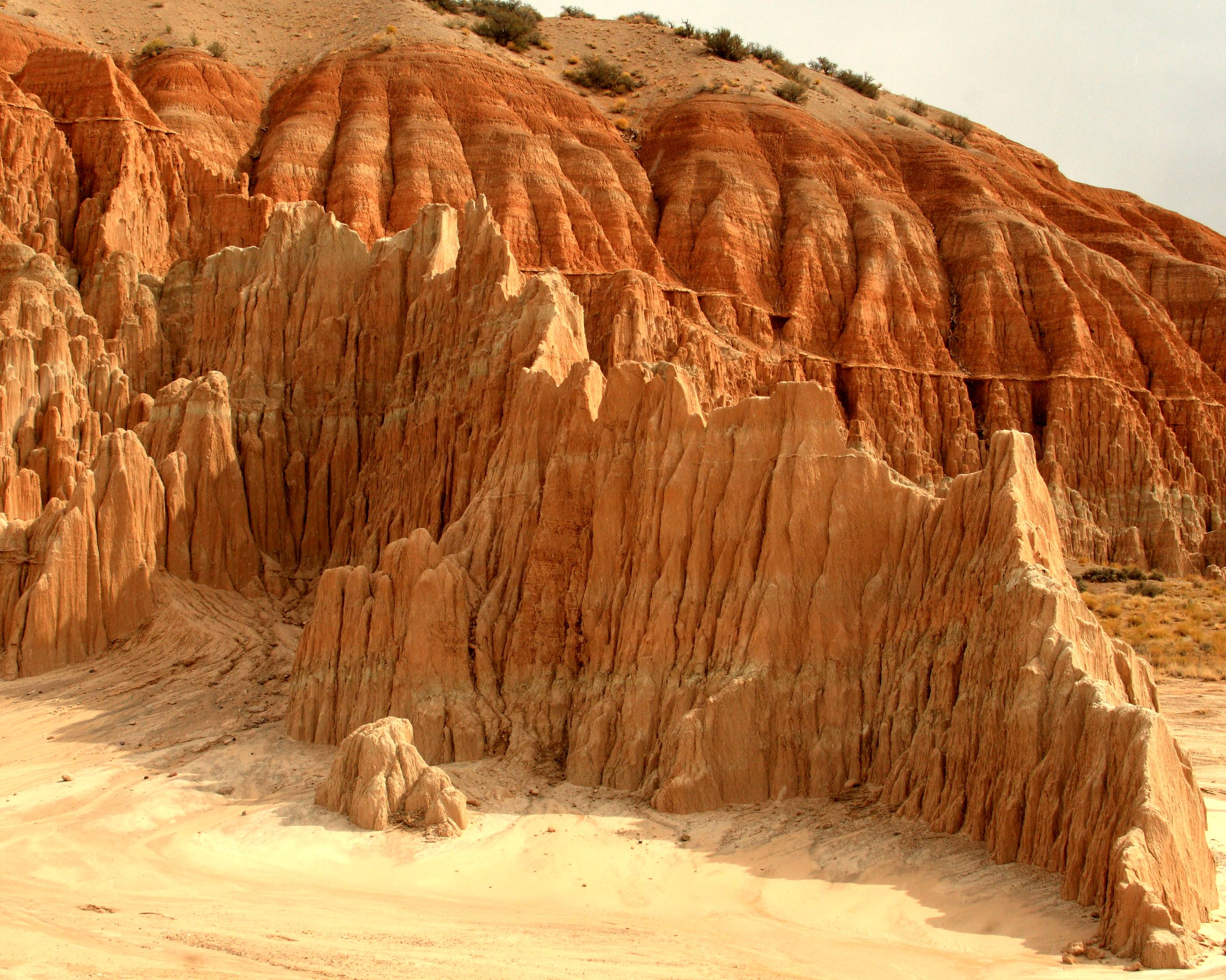
Cathedral Gorge State Park

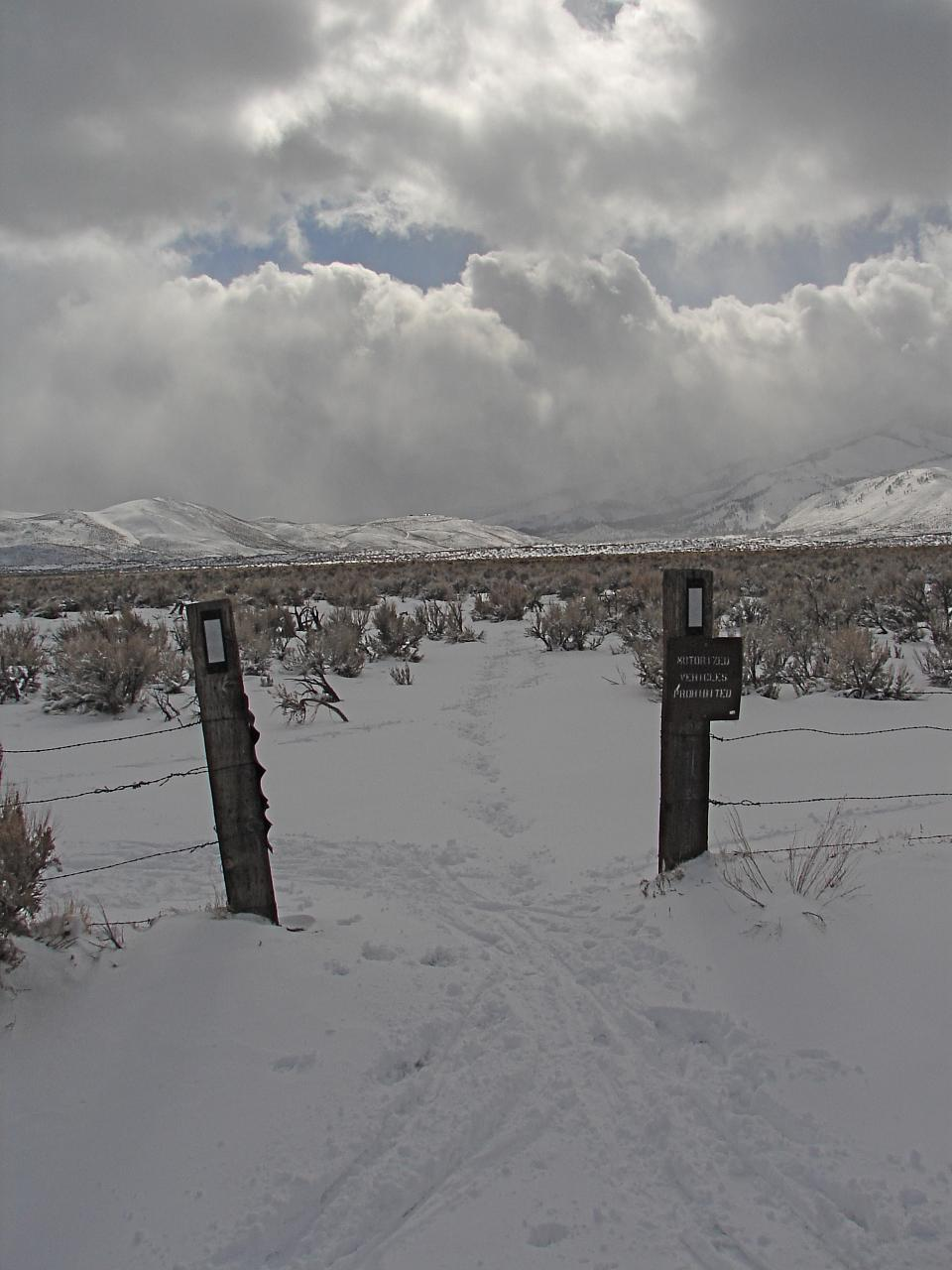
Washoe Lake State Park

== Nevada state parks and state recreation areas ==
Park name	Image	County	Area		Elevation		Estab- lished	Remarks
Park name	Image	County	acres	ha	ft	m	Estab- lished	Remarks
Beaver Dam State Park		Lincoln	2,182	883	5,395	1,644	1935	Preserves a section of Beaver Dam Wash in eastern Nevada's most remote state park.
Berlin–Ichthyosaur State Park		Nye	1,116	452	6,975	2,126	1957	Preserves in situ ichthyosaur fossils and the ghost town of Berlin.
Big Bend of the Colorado State Recreation Area		Clark	2,093	847	500	150	1996	Overlooks the Colorado River within the town limits of Laughlin.
Cathedral Gorge State Park		Lincoln	1,756	711	4,819	1,469	1935	Showcases a gorge with soft bentonite walls eroded into dramatic spires.
Cave Lake State Park		White Pine	4,063	1,644	7,198	2,194	1973	Features a 32-acre (13 ha) reservoir in the northern Schell Creek Range.
Dayton State Park		Lyon	152	62	4,360	1,330	1977	Features a stretch of the Carson River and the site of an 1861 mill built to process silver ore from the Comstock Lode.
Echo Canyon State Park		Lincoln	1,055	427	5,348	1,630	1970	Adjoins a 65-acre (26 ha) reservoir.
Ice Age Fossils State Park		Clark	323	131	2,340	710	2017	Offers trails to fossil beds and archaeological sites. Opened January 2024.
Kershaw–Ryan State Park		Lincoln	1,696	686	4,805	1,465	1935	Features a verdant canyon first homesteaded in 1873.
Lahontan State Recreation Area		Churchill, Lyon	28,889	11,691	4,258	1,298	1971	Surrounds the Lahontan Reservoir, a 10,000-acre (4,000 ha) reservoir on the Carson River.
Lake Tahoe – Nevada State Park		Carson City, Washoe County	14,301	5,787	7,880	2,400	1963	Comprises six units on the northeastern shore of Lake Tahoe and its backcountry.
Rye Patch State Recreation Area		Pershing	2,424	981	4,137	1,261	1971	Adjoins the 11,000-acre (4,500 ha) Rye Patch Reservoir on the Humboldt River.
South Fork State Recreation Area		Elko	3,903	1,579	5,226	1,593	1983	Surrounds the 1,650-acre (670 ha) South Fork Reservoir on the South Fork Humboldt River.
Spring Mountain Ranch State Park		Clark	539	218	3,727	1,136	1974	Preserves the historic Sandstone Ranch established in 1876.
Spring Valley State Park		Lincoln	916	371	5,869	1,789	1969	Adjoins the 65-acre (26 ha) Eagle Valley Reservoir.
Valley of Fire State Park		Clark	45,938	18,590	2,464	751	1934	Showcases red sandstone formations in Nevada's oldest and largest state park.
Van Sickle Bi-State Park		Douglas	558	226	6,283	1,915	2011	Managed in conjunction with the California Tahoe Conservancy; 575 acres lie within Nevada while 150 are within El Dorado County, California.
Walker River State Recreation Area		Lyon	12,312	4,982	4,580	1,400	2018	Includes five historic ranch units along a thirty-mile stretch of the East Walker River.
Washoe Lake State Park		Washoe	3,772	1,526	5,033	1,534	1977	Provides recreation opportunities on Washoe Lake, between Carson City and Reno.
Wild Horse State Recreation Area		Elko	120	49	6,250	1,900	1979	Provides water recreation on the northeast shore of 2,830-acre (1,150 ha) Wild Horse Reservoir on the Owyhee River.

== Nevada state historic parks and sites ==
Park name	Image	County	Area		Elevation		Estab- lished	Remarks
Park name	Image	County	acres	ha	ft	m	Estab- lished	Remarks
Elgin Schoolhouse State Historic Site		Lincoln	1.8	0.73	3,402	1,037	2005	Preserves a rural schoolhouse used from 1922 to 1967.
Fort Churchill State Historic Park		Lyon	5,170	2,090	4,255	1,297	1957	Encompasses the ruins of a U.S. Army fort staffed 1860–1869, plus a waystation on the Pony Express and Central Overland Routes, and a corridor along the Carson River connecting to Lahontan State Recreation Area.
Mormon Station State Historic Park		Douglas	3.6	1.5	4,783	1,458	1955	Interprets Nevada's first permanent nonnative settlement, established in 1851 on the California Trail by Mormon pioneers.
Old Las Vegas Mormon Fort State Historic Park		Clark	3.16	1.28	1,923	586	1991	Interprets a partially reconstructed fort built by Mormon missionaries in 1855, the first nonnative structure in what would become Las Vegas.
Ward Charcoal Ovens State Historic Park		White Pine	861	348	7,054	2,150	1994	Preserves six 30-foot-high (9.1 m) charcoal ovens used from 1876–1879 to produce fuel for smelting silver ore.

== Former Nevada state parks ==
- Floyd Lamb State Park was renamed Floyd Lamb Park at Tule Springs on July 2, 2007, when ownership was transferred to the City of Las Vegas.
- Dangberg Home Ranch Historic Park was operated by Nevada State Parks until June 30, 2011, when ownership was transferred to Douglas County.
- The former Walker Lake State Park became Walker Lake State Recreation Area then ceased to be maintained by the Nevada Division of State Parks.

== See also ==
- List of national parks of the United States
