= Washoe Lake State Park =

State park in Nevada, United States

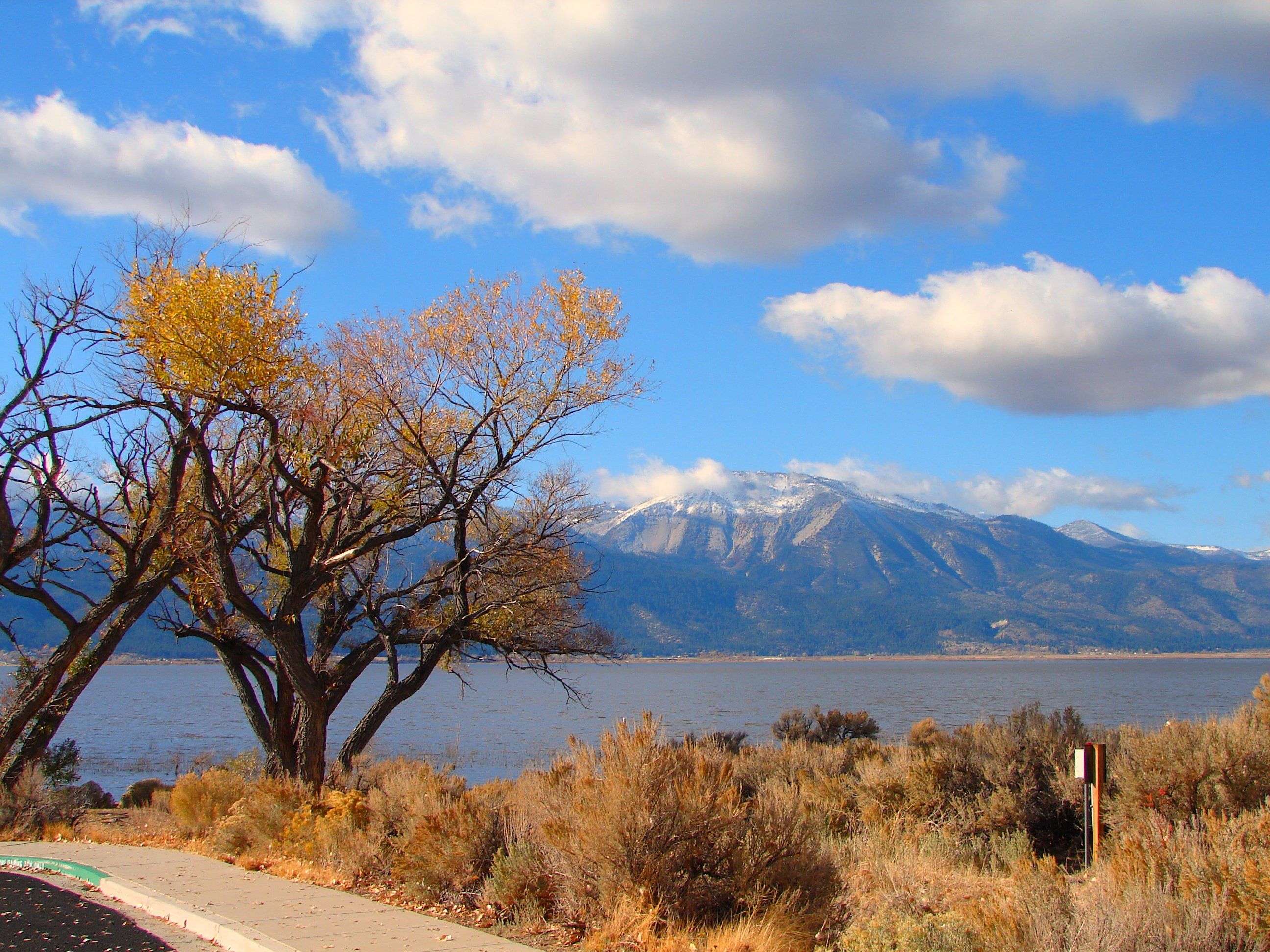
- Slide Mountain seen across Washoe Lake from the park

- Location within Nevada
- Location: Washoe County, Nevada, United States
- Nearest city: Carson City, Nevada
- Coordinates: 39°13′56″N 119°46′49″W
- Area: 3,772.7 acres (1,526.8 ha)
- Elevation: 5,053 ft (1,540 m)
- Established: 1977
- Administrator: Nevada Division of State Parks
- Visitors: 39,249 vehicles (in 2017)
- Designation: Nevada state park
- Website: Official website

Washoe Lake State Park is a year-round public recreation area occupying over 3,700 acres (1,500 ha) on the southeast shore of Washoe Lake in Washoe County, Nevada. The state park lies to the east of Lake Tahoe, approximately five miles (8.0 km) north of Carson City near U.S. Route 395. The area around the park is known for its high winds making Washoe Lake a popular destination for windsurfers.

== History ==
The first known inhabitants of the area in and surrounding Washoe State Park were the Washoe people. The Washoe would generally spend the winter in the lowlands of the Washoe Valley and summer on the shores of Lake Tahoe. The Washoe used cattails and willows from the shores of Washoe Lake to make baskets.

White settlers arrived on a permanent basis in the area soon after the discovery of silver in the Comstock Lode near Virginia City in 1859. The find brought thousands of traders, loggers, and miners to the Washoe Valley. Franktown, west of Washoe Lake, was established by Mormon pioneers in the same year. Two silver processing mills were built near the lake. Ophir Mill was built on Washoe Lake's western shore and the New York Mill was built beside Little Washoe Lake. The remnants of both mills can be seen today.

The Virginia and Truckee Railroad was built through the valley in 1872. It connected Reno with Carson City. This railroad remained in operation until 1950. The mining boom was over by the end of the 1870s and many of the early settlers left the area. Those that remained began ranching and farming the land. The Washoe people were not fully displaced from their traditional lands until the farms and ranches took hold in the Washoe Valley.

Washoe Lake State Park was opened on the southern and eastern shores of the lake in 1977. It was established to preserve the scenic beauty of the area for future generations. The cities of Reno and Carson City are encroaching on the lands of Washoe Lake State Park, but its protected status ensures that the park will remain in its natural state for years to come. Commonly seen wildlife include mule deer, hawk, coyotes, and eagles.

== Activities and amenities ==
Recreational opportunities at the park include picnicking facilities, boat launches, a 49-site campground, equestrian area, and several miles of trails open to foot, horse, and ATV traffic. A large group pavilion has a beach volleyball pit and horseshoe pit nearby. The park is open to hunting during the designated hunting seasons. Because the lake is very shallow, it frequently dries up and is regularly restocked by the Nevada Division of Wildlife.

== In popular culture ==
One of the scenes from John Wayne's final film The Shootist was filmed at the park.
