= Big Bend, Butte County, California =

Unincorporated community in California, United States

Big Bend
- Unincorporated community
- Location in California Big Bend (the United States)
- Coordinates: 39°41′54″N 121°27′39″W
- Country: United States
- State: California
- County: Butte
- Elevation: 2,310 ft (704 m)

Big Bend (formerly, Bigbend) is an unincorporated community in Butte County, California, United States. It lies at an elevation of 2310 feet (704 m). A post office operated in Big Bend from 1883 to 1891.

Big Bend was the site of the Big Bend Tunnel Project, established in 1880 to dig a tunnel bypassing a large bend in the Feather River so that gold could be easily recovered from the dry segment of riverbed. The project, overseen by engineer Frank McLaughlin, constructed a tunnel thirteen feet by sixteen feet in cross-section, and twelve thousand feet long. The project, however, was deemed a failure and was discontinued in 1887. The tunnel was later used as a part of the water supply to Pacific Gas and Electric's Big Bend Powerhouse.
