= Nevada State Route 317 =

Highway in Nevada

State Route 317
- Rainbow Canyon Road
- SR 317 highlighted in red

Route information
- Maintained by NDOT
- Length: 21.490 mi (34.585 km)
- Existed: 1976–present

Major junctions
- South end: Kane Springs and Carp Roads in Elgin
- North end: US 93 in Caliente

Location
- Country: United States
- State: Nevada

Highway system
- Nevada State Highway System; Interstate; US; State; Pre‑1976; Scenic
← SR 306	→ SR 318

State Route 317 (SR 317) is a 21.490-mile-long (34.585 km) state highway in Lincoln County, Nevada. It connects the ghost town of Elgin north to U.S. Route 93 (US 93) in the city of Caliente. Portions of the highway were heavily damaged by flooding in January 2005 and repairs were not yet complete as of January 2015.

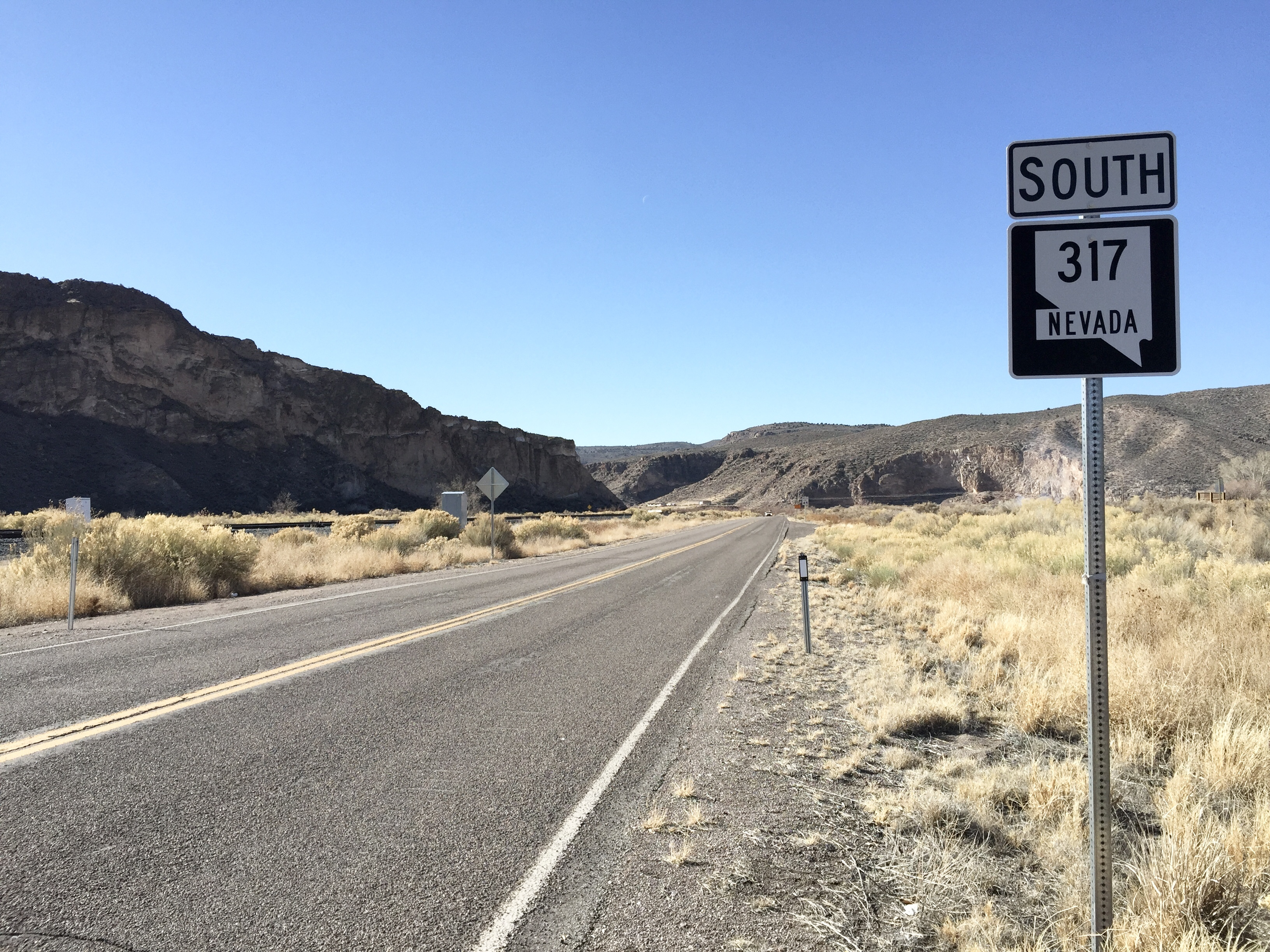
View from the north end of SR 317 looking southbound

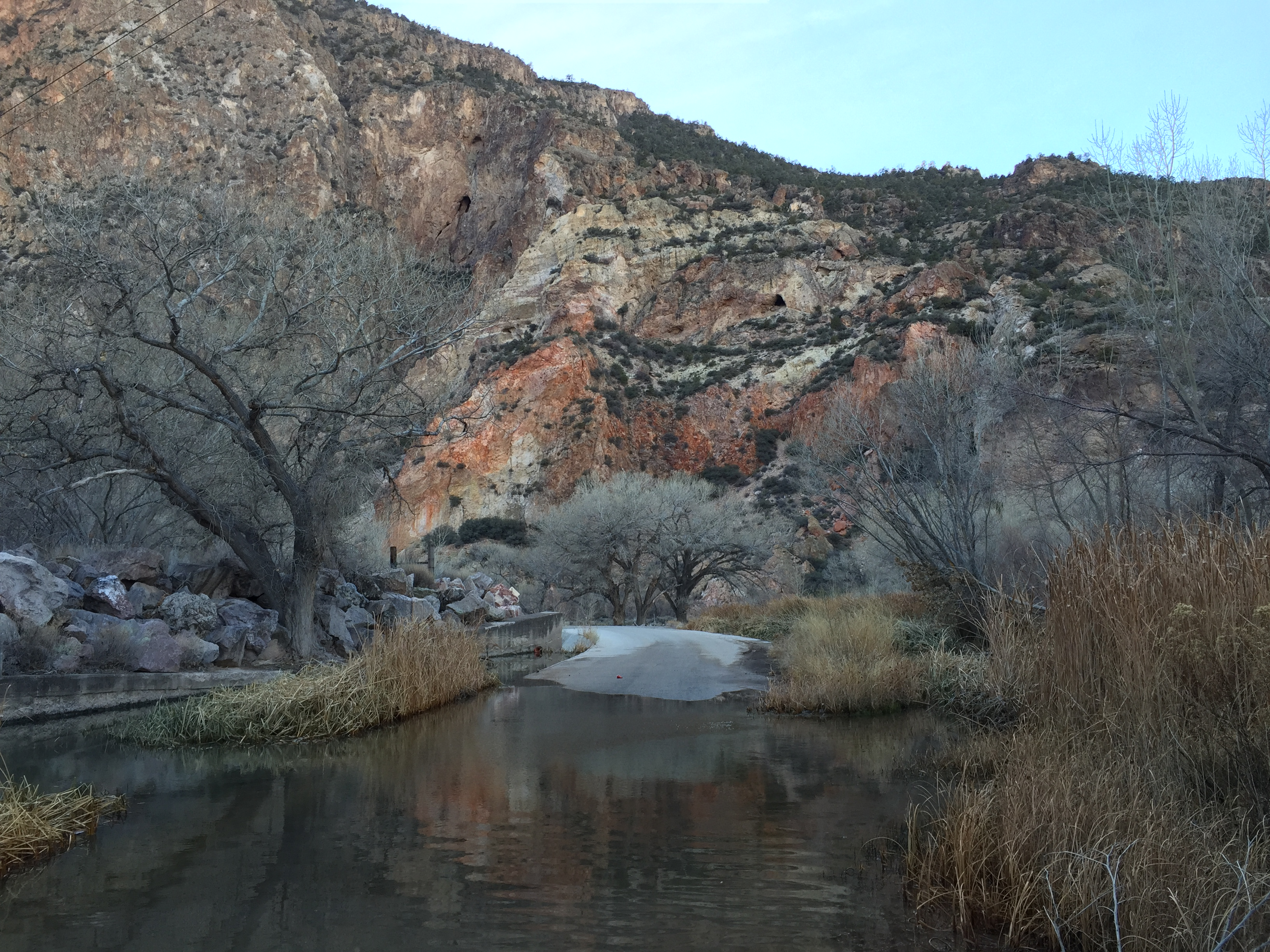
Flood-damaged section of SR 317 in January 2015

== History ==
State Route 55 was a state highway in the U.S. state of Nevada, running south from U.S. Route 93 in Caliente into Kershaw–Ryan State Park. It was defined by 1935 and survived until the 1976 renumbering. As a result of the renumbering, SR 317 was assigned to the segment of SR 55 from US 93 in Caliente to Kershaw Park Entrance Rd.

== Major intersections ==
The entire route is in Lincoln County.

Location	mi	km	Destinations	Notes
Elgin	0.000	0.000	Kane Springs Road	
Caliente	21.490	34.585	US 93 – Las Vegas, Ely	
1.000 mi = 1.609 km; 1.000 km = 0.621 mi
