= Big Bend (Colorado River, Utah) =

Coordinates: 38°38′51″N 109°28′51″W

Big Bend is a meander or bend in a deep canyon along the Colorado River, in Grand County, Utah. It lies within the bounds of Arches National Park at an elevation of 3,980 feet / 1,213 meters, 6.3 miles northeast of Moab, Utah.
