= Big Bend City, Minnesota =

Unincorporated community in Minnesota, US

Big Bend City
- Unincorporated community
- Location within Minnesota Location within the United States
- Coordinates: 45°08′35″N 95°46′19″W
- Country: United States
- State: Minnesota
- County: Chippewa
- Elevation: 1,037 ft (316 m)
- Time zone: UTC-6 (Central (CST))
  - Summer (DST): UTC-5 (CDT)
- Area code: 320
- GNIS feature ID: 640078

Big Bend City is an unincorporated community in Big Bend Township, Chippewa County, Minnesota, United States.
