= North Pahroc Range =

Mountain range in Nevada, United States

- Location within Nevada

Highest point
- Elevation: 2,086 m (6,844 ft)

Geography
- Country: United States
- State: Nevada
- District: Lincoln County
- Range coordinates: 37°41′57.859″N 114°57′3.045″W
- Topo map: USGS Pahroc Spring

The North Pahroc Range is a mountain range in Lincoln County, Nevada. The BLM Big Rocks Wilderness Area protects 12,997 acres (5,260 ha) of the southernmost portion of the North Pahroc Range. To the south is the South Pahroc Range Wilderness.

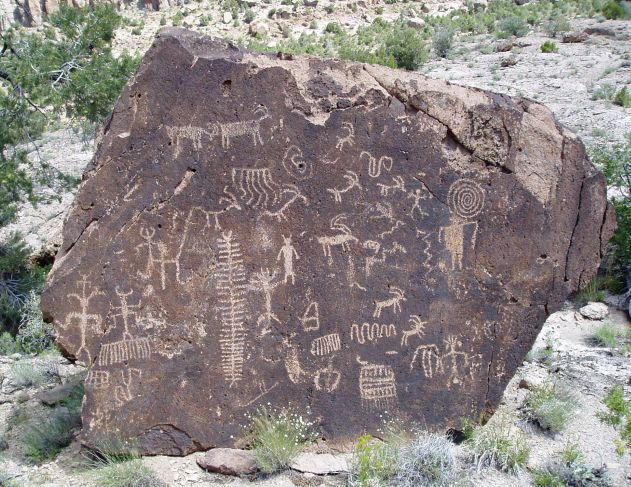
Petroglyphs in the Big Rocks Wilderness
