= Big Bend Peak =

Mountain peak in Banff NP, Alberta, Canada

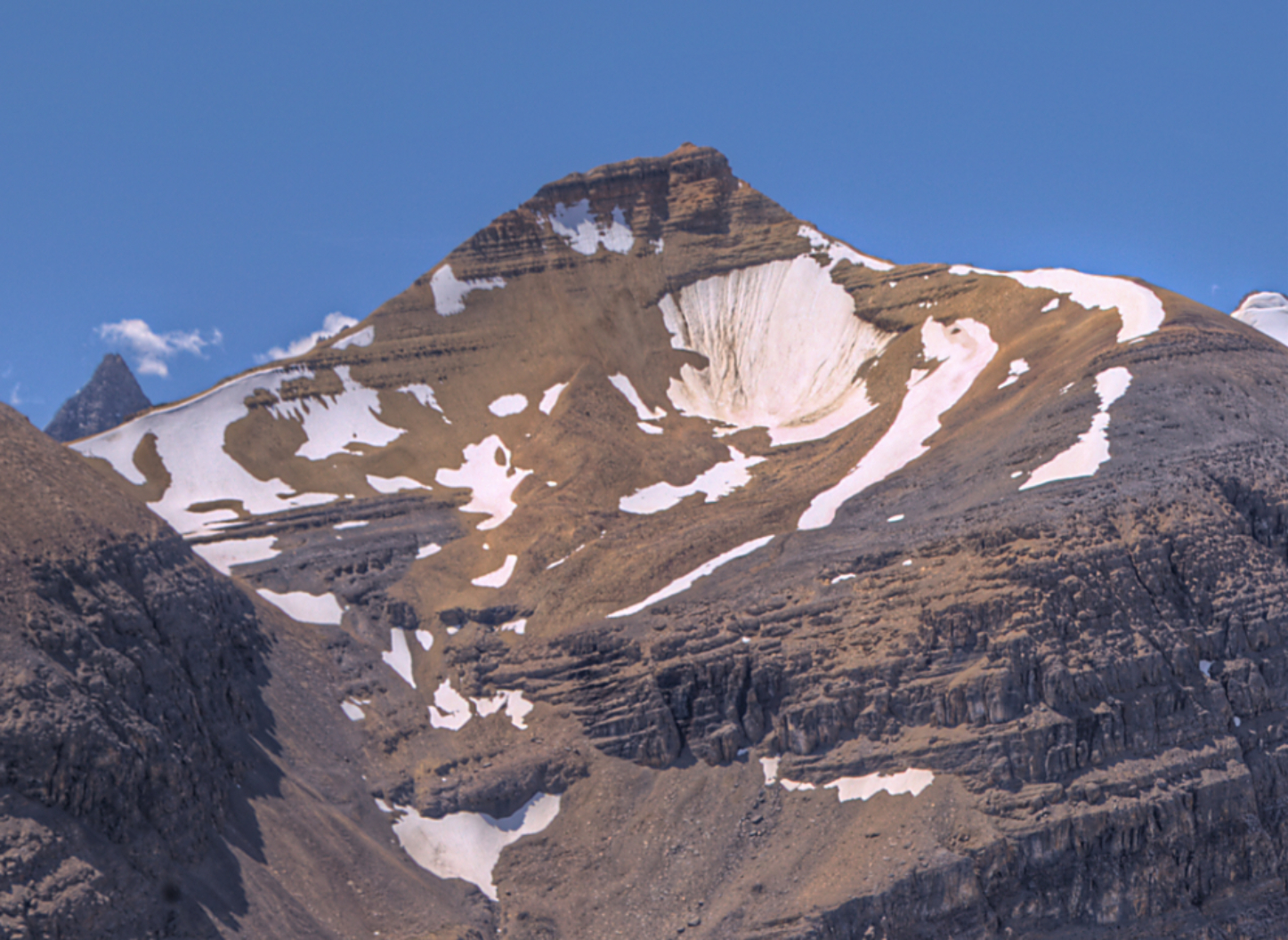
- Big Bend Peak

Highest point
- Elevation: 2,804 m (9,199 ft)
- Prominence: 224 m (735 ft)
- Parent peak: Mount Saskatchewan (3342 m)
- Listing: Mountains of Alberta
- Coordinates: 52°08′54″N 117°06′41″W

Geography
- Location within Alberta Location within Canada
- Interactive map of Big Bend Peak
- Location: Banff National Park; Alberta, Canada
- Parent range: Canadian Rockies
- Topo map: NTS 83C3 Columbia Icefield

Geology
- Rock type: Sedimentary

Big Bend Peak is a 2,804-metre (9,199-foot) mountain summit located in the upper North Saskatchewan River valley in Banff National Park, in the Canadian Rockies of Alberta, Canada. Its nearest higher peak is Mount Saskatchewan, 5.5 km (3.4 mi) to the south. Big Bend Peak is situated on the west side of the Icefields Parkway four kilometres southwest of the "big bend" in the road, hence the peak's name origin.

== Geology ==
Like other mountains in Banff Park, Big Bend Peak is composed of sedimentary rock laid down from the Precambrian to Jurassic periods. Formed in shallow seas, this sedimentary rock was pushed east and over the top of younger rock during the Laramide orogeny.

== Climate ==
Based on the Köppen climate classification, Big Bend Peak is in a subarctic climate zone with cold, snowy winters, and mild summers. Winter temperatures can drop below −20 °C with wind chill factors below −30 °C. Precipitation runoff from Big Bend Peak drains into the North Saskatchewan River.

== Gallery ==
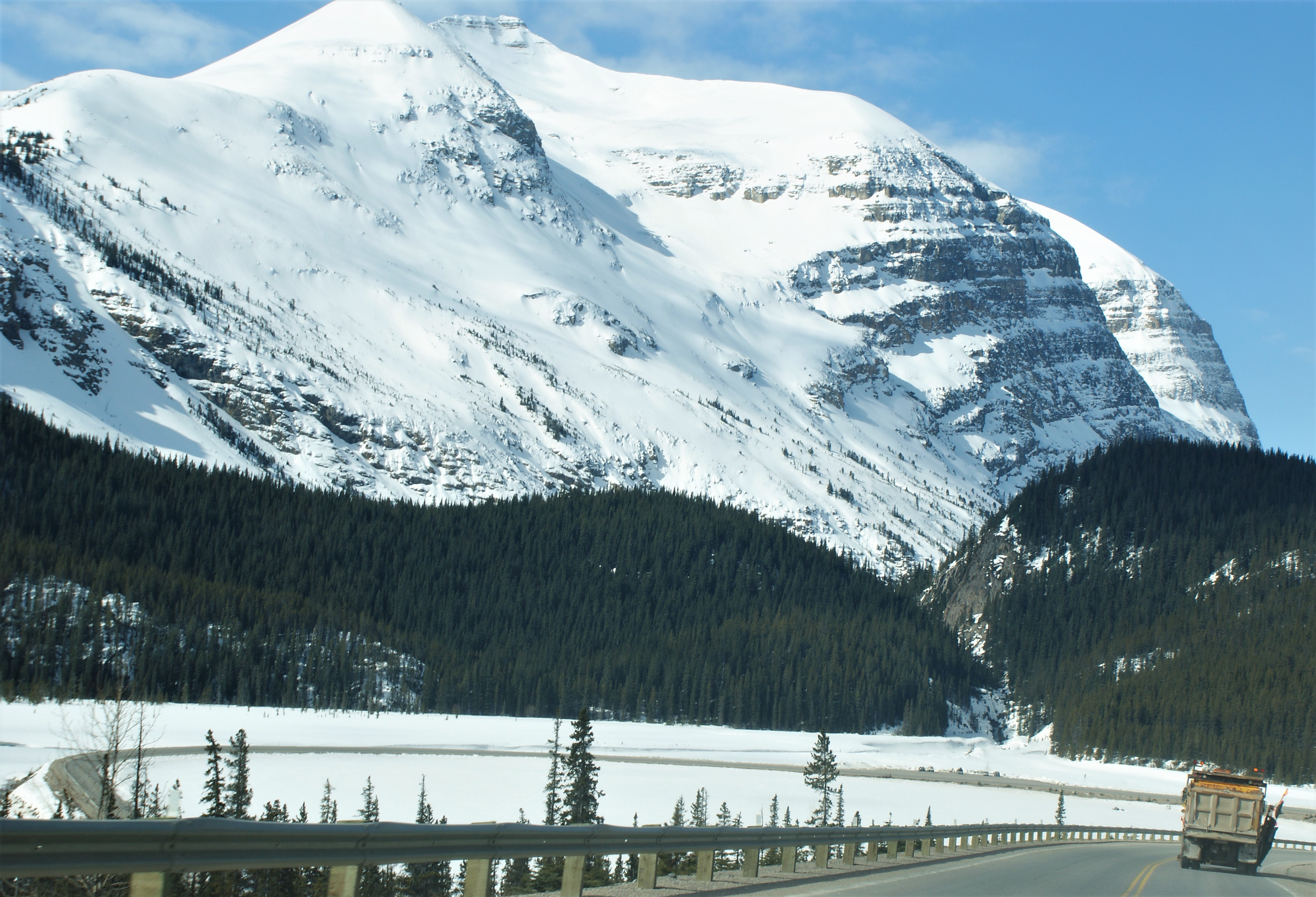
Northeast aspect of Big Bend Peak seen from the big bend of the Icefields Parkway

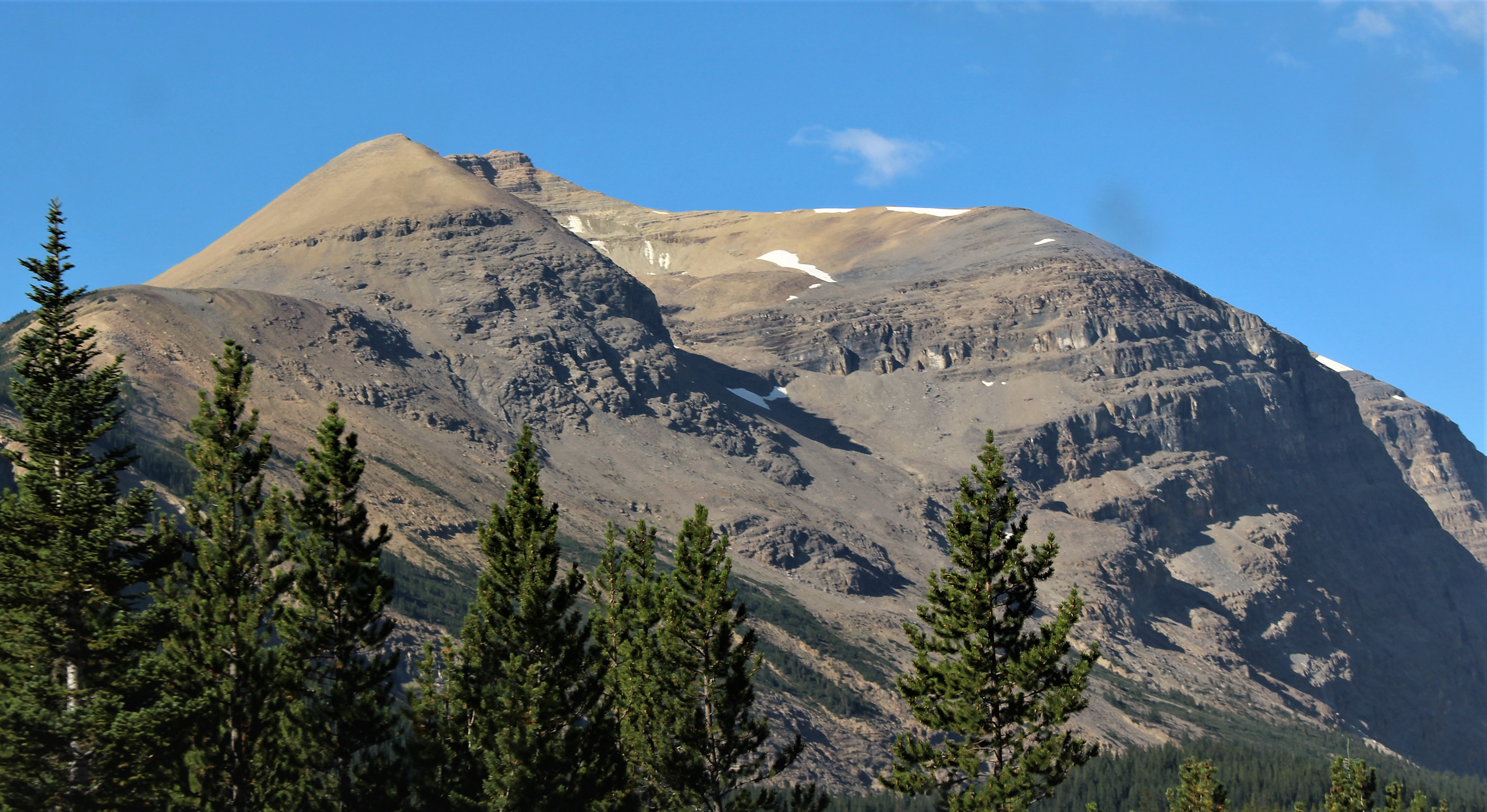
Northeast aspect of Big Bend Peak seen from the Icefields Parkway

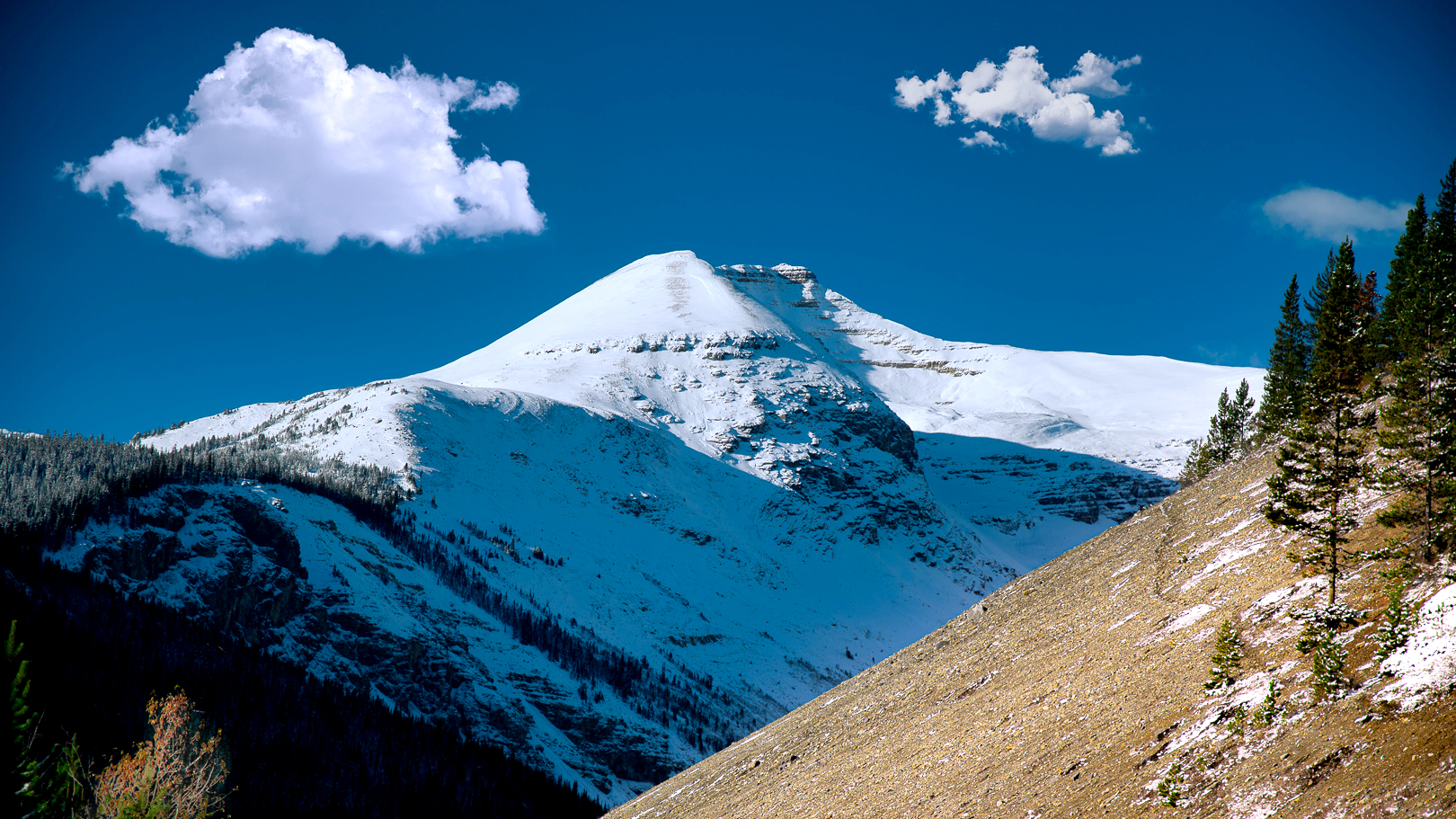

== See also ==
- List of mountains of Canada
- Geography of Alberta
