= The Big Bend =

Proposed skyscraper in New York City

- Artist's conception of the Big Bend over Central Park
- Interactive map of the The Big Bend area

General information
- Status: Proposed
- Classification: Residential
- Location: Billionaires' Row, New York City, US
- Coordinates: 40°45′55″N 73°58′42″W

Height
- Height: > 2,000 feet (610 m)

Design and construction
- Architect: Ioannis Oikonomou
- Architecture firm: Oiio Studio
- Known for: proposal for world's longest building

The Big Bend is a proposed megatall skyscraper for Billionaires' Row in Midtown Manhattan. The skyscraper, which was designed by the New York architecture firm Oiio Studio in 2017, would be the tallest building in the Western Hemisphere at 2,000 feet (610 m) if it were built. Reception to the proposal has been mixed.

== Architecture ==
The Big Bend was designed by Ioannis Oikonomou of the architecture firm Oiio Studio. The proposal is most known for its distinctive arch-shape, which would make it the longest building in the world, though not the tallest, were it built. It would have a length of 4,000 feet (1,200 m) from one base to the top of the building to the other base. The proposal is a very tall and slender building, with a peak height above the ground that would be more than 1,969 feet (600 m). This would make it a megatall building, as well as the tallest building in New York City, surpassing One World Trade Center by 200 feet (61 m).

The structure is similar to the nearby "super-slender" 111 West 57th Street, with a grid of large windows, but would have even smaller floorplates.

Traversal of the Big Bend would be possible with an elevator that can travel in curves, as well as horizontally, in a continuous loop. Oiio Studio has stated that the technology for such an elevator is close to being a reality.

The Big Bend's upside-down U-shape was conceived as an attempt to circumvent zoning regulations restricting skyscraper height in Manhattan, and also as a response to the proliferation of luxury supertall skyscrapers in the area. Ioannis Oikonomou has said that the building "can become a modest architectural solution to the height limitations of Manhattan."

== Site ==
The Big Bend would likely stand on a stretch of 57th Street called Billionaires' Row, south of Central Park in Midtown Manhattan. The Calvary Baptist Church would be between the skyscraper's two bases. The building's two bases are occupied by a 22-story condo and two 5-story apartment buildings. It would be on the same block as two other supertall skyscrapers: One57 to the west and 111 West 57th Street to the east.

== Reception ==
As of March 2017, online reception to the Big Bend proposal has been mixed.

Amy Plitt of Curbed New York has argued that the Big Bend is unlikely to ever be built. Plitt cited opposition to supertall skyscrapers by the local community, as well as a lack of funding, as potential issues for the project. The nearby Calvary Baptist Church and the Department of City Planning have not given official comments on the proposal, as of March 2017. Layla Law-Gisiko, the chair of the Sunshine Task Force of Community Board 5 took note of the Oiio Studio's imaginative nature, but called the design "silly" and "out of touch".

As of 2017, the Big Bend was in the proposal stage. Having sent the design to several developers, Oikonomou was seeking investment for the project.

== See also ==
- List of tallest twin buildings and structures
- List of tallest buildings in the United States
