= Big Bend of the Colorado State Recreation Area =

Recreation area in Nevada, United States

- Location within Nevada
- Interactive map of Big Bend of the Colorado; State Recreation Area
- Location: Laughlin, Nevada, United States
- Nearest city: Bullhead City, Arizona
- Coordinates: 35°6′38″N 114°38′35″W
- Area: 2,104.93 acres (851.83 ha)
- Established: 1996
- Administrator: Nevada Division of State Parks
- Visitors: 20,628 vehicles (in 2017)
- Designation: Nevada state recreation area
- Website: Official website

Big Bend of the Colorado State Recreation Area is a 2,100-acre (850 ha) public recreation area on the west bank of the Colorado River in the Lower Colorado River Valley. It is located in Laughlin, an unincorporated township in Clark County, Nevada. The park sits directly across the Colorado River from Bullhead City, Arizona, and is approximately 9 miles (14 km) downstream of the Davis Dam. The park has two miles of shoreline and riparian areas. The majority of its 2,100 acres (850 ha) consists of canyons and washes.

== History ==
The Fort Mohave Land Act of 1960 saw the transfer of 15,000 acres (6,100 ha) of federal land in the Laughlin Big Bend area to the Colorado River Commission of Nevada. The commission transferred 2,100 acres (850 ha) to the Nevada Division of State Parks in 1991, which resulted in establishment of Big Bend of the Colorado State Recreation Area. It opened to the public in 1996.

== Activities and amenities ==
The recreation area offers boating, fishing, camping, picnicking, and hiking on four miles of developed trails.
