= Caliente, Nevada =

City in Lincoln County, Nevada, United States

- City
- Caliente Railroad Depot in 2026.

- Logo
- Nickname: City of Roses
- Location of Caliente, Nevada

- Location within Nevada Location within the United States
- Coordinates: 37°36′55″N 114°30′51″W
- Country: United States
- State: Nevada
- County: Lincoln

Government
  - Mayor: Steve Rowe

Area
  - Total: 53.02 sq mi (137.33 km^{2})
  - Land: 53.02 sq mi (137.33 km^{2})
  - Water: 0 sq mi (0.00 km^{2})
- Elevation: 5,131 ft (1,564 m)

Population (2020)
  - Total: 990
  - Density: 18.7/sq mi (7.21/km^{2})
- Time zone: UTC−8 (Pacific (PST))
  - Summer (DST): UTC−7 (PDT)
- ZIP code: 89008
- Area code: 775
- FIPS code: 32-08500
- GNIS feature ID: 2409959
- Website: www.cityofcaliente.com

Caliente /kæliˈɛnti/, formerly known as Culverwell and Calientes, is a city in Lincoln County, Nevada, United States. The population was 990 at the 2020 census. It is both the least populous incorporated city in Nevada and the only incorporated city in Lincoln County. The city's name originated from the nearby hot springs, as "caliente" is the Spanish word meaning "hot".

== History ==
Caliente was founded in 1901 on Culverwell Ranch (or just "Culverwell"), built on land owned by William and Charles Culverwell. The town was initially given the name of "Calientes", due to the hot springs present in the area, but later in the year a post office was erected and workers removed the "s" from the name of the town. In 1905, the Los Angeles and Salt Lake Railroad was completed, followed by the construction of the train depot in the style of Spanish mission architecture. The train depot, built in 1923, is now home to some city and county offices and a museum that exhibits historical information. Caliente once reached a peak of over 5,000 residents, but declined in the late 1940s as a result of rail dieselization.

== Demographics ==
Historical population
Census	Pop.	Note	%±
1950	970		—
1960	792		−18.4%
1970	916		15.7%
1980	982		7.2%
1990	1,111		13.1%
2000	1,123		1.1%
2010	1,130		0.6%
2020	990		−12.4%
U.S. Decennial Census

As of the census of 2000, there were 1,123 people, 408 households, and 241 families residing in the city. The population density was 603.7 inhabitants per square mile (233.1/km^{2}). There were 479 housing units at an average density of 257.5 per square mile (99.4/km^{2}). The racial makeup of the city was 87.27% White, 1.96% Black or African American, 3.03% Native American, 0.62% Asian, 0.09% Pacific Islander, 3.56% from other races, and 3.47% from two or more races. 7.30% of the population were Hispanic or Latino or of any type of race.

There were 408 households, out of which 29.4% had children under the age of 18 living with them, 46.1% were married couples living together, 11.8% had a female householder with no husband present, and 40.9% were non-families. 37.3% of all households were made up of individuals, and 18.1% had someone living alone who was 65 years of age or older. The average household size was 2.34 and the average family size was 3.12.

In the city, the population was spread out, with 39.1% under the age of 18, 5.2% from 18 to 24, 17.5% from 25 to 44, 21.9% from 45 to 64, and 16.3% who were 65 years of age or older. The median age was 33 years. For every 100 females, there were 89.7 males. For every 100 females age 18 and over, there were 85.4 males.

The median income for a household in the city was $25,833, and the median income for a family was $38,667. Males had a median income of $39,500 versus $24,688 for females. The per capita income for the city was $20,555. About 17.3% of families and 22.3% of the population were below the poverty line, including 31.4% of those under age 18 and 17.9% of those age 65 or over.

== Geography ==
Shops and businesses along Clover Street in October 2026.

According to the United States Census Bureau, the city has a total area of 54.8 square miles (141.9 km^{2}), all of it land.

=== Climate ===
Caliente has a high-desert climate typical for a location around 4,000 feet (1,200 m) in elevation. Winters are chilly, but only moderately cold. Summers are characterized by blazing sunshine, long days, cool nights, and high diurnal temperature range. January highs average in the mid 40s, while July averages mid 90s.

A majority of precipitation occurs in the winter months (November–March) due to the yearly dip of the jet stream bringing Pacific storms. Temperatures in summer are very warm to hot. The July average of 95.4 °F (35.2 °C) means that 100-degree days are a common occurrence in a typical summer. The elevation, aridity, and clear skies allow intense radiative cooling, even in midsummer. This means hot days are followed by mild evenings. Southerly monsoon rains from mid-July through September bring thunderstorms, increased dew points, and flash flooding.

Climate data for Caliente, Nevada (1991–2020 normals, extremes 1903–1916, 1931–2020)
Month	Jan	Feb	Mar	Apr	May	Jun	Jul	Aug	Sep	Oct	Nov	Dec	Year
Record high °F (°C)	71 (22)	81 (27)	90 (32)	94 (34)	103 (39)	109 (43)	110 (43)	108 (42)	106 (41)	95 (35)	82 (28)	71 (22)	110 (43)
Mean daily maximum °F (°C)	48.5 (9.2)	53.4 (11.9)	62.1 (16.7)	68.7 (20.4)	78.7 (25.9)	90.0 (32.2)	96.5 (35.8)	94.2 (34.6)	86.8 (30.4)	73.7 (23.2)	59.9 (15.5)	48.1 (8.9)	71.7 (22.1)
Daily mean °F (°C)	33.5 (0.8)	38.0 (3.3)	45.2 (7.3)	51.3 (10.7)	60.4 (15.8)	69.8 (21.0)	76.8 (24.9)	74.8 (23.8)	66.5 (19.2)	54.0 (12.2)	41.7 (5.4)	33.0 (0.6)	53.8 (12.1)
Mean daily minimum °F (°C)	18.6 (−7.4)	22.5 (−5.3)	28.2 (−2.1)	33.8 (1.0)	42.1 (5.6)	49.7 (9.8)	57.2 (14.0)	55.4 (13.0)	46.1 (7.8)	34.2 (1.2)	23.6 (−4.7)	17.9 (−7.8)	35.8 (2.1)
Record low °F (°C)	−31 (−35)	−19 (−28)	2 (−17)	15 (−9)	22 (−6)	33 (1)	40 (4)	34 (1)	25 (−4)	9 (−13)	0 (−18)	−18 (−28)	−31 (−35)
Average precipitation inches (mm)	0.86 (22)	0.99 (25)	1.20 (30)	0.58 (15)	0.68 (17)	0.39 (9.9)	0.69 (18)	0.86 (22)	0.49 (12)	0.75 (19)	0.55 (14)	0.81 (21)	8.85 (225)
Average snowfall inches (cm)	2.8 (7.1)	2.2 (5.6)	0.5 (1.3)	0.2 (0.51)	0.0 (0.0)	0.0 (0.0)	0.0 (0.0)	0.0 (0.0)	0.0 (0.0)	0.0 (0.0)	0.3 (0.76)	2.7 (6.9)	8.7 (22)
Average precipitation days (≥ 0.01 in)	4.7	4.8	4.9	4.1	4.2	1.9	4.2	4.1	3.2	3.5	2.8	4.0	46.4
Average snowy days (≥ 0.1 in)	1.2	1.1	0.4	0.3	0.0	0.0	0.0	0.0	0.0	0.0	0.5	1.2	4.7
Source: NOAA

== Attractions ==
Caliente post office in 2026.

*Caliente is located near Kershaw–Ryan State Park. This park contains hiking trails, campgrounds, volleyball courts, picnic pavilions, horseshoe pits, a playground, and a small natural swimming pool.

- The Caliente Rail Depot is a two-story Los Angeles and Salt Lake Railroad depot next to the rail line. It houses the city's offices, a library, and a gallery.

== Outdoor recreation ==
Caliente is home to extensive outdoor recreation opportunities. As of mid-2020, there are approximately 30 miles of purpose-built singletrack mountain bike trail in and around town, bringing mountain bikers from across the country to enjoy the wild, isolated Nevada desert. There are thousands of miles of motorized off-road track and trail, and several large motorized races and events are hosted in Caliente each year. Rainbow Canyon and Big Rocks Wilderness offer a wide variety of rock climbing routes, while nearby Eagle Valley Reservoir boasts fishing and boating.

== FLDS controversy ==
According to testimony given in the criminal case, Utah v. Warren Jeffs, the Hot Springs Motel located in Caliente is the site of several forced marriages between under-aged girls and older men. The hotel was owned and operated by members of the Fundamentalist Church of Jesus Christ of Latter-Day Saints (FLDS Church). This was verified in grand jury testimony involving the trial Arizona v. Warren Jeffs. Jeffs was the leader of the polygamous FLDS Church, and before his capture was on the FBI Ten Most Wanted Fugitives list. The motel was sold to a Las Vegas company in 2004.

== See also ==
- List of cities in Nevada
