= Big Bend Township, Chippewa County, Minnesota =

Big Bend Township, Minnesota
- Township
- Location within the state of Minnesota Big Bend Township, Minnesota (the United States)
- Coordinates: 45°7′23″N 95°47′14″W
- Country: United States
- State: Minnesota
- County: Chippewa

Area
  - Total: 35.8 sq mi (92.7 km^{2})
  - Land: 35.8 sq mi (92.6 km^{2})
  - Water: 0.039 sq mi (0.1 km^{2})
- Elevation: 958 ft (292 m)

Population (2000)
  - Total: 257
  - Density: 7.3/sq mi (2.8/km^{2})
- Time zone: UTC-6 (Central (CST))
  - Summer (DST): UTC-5 (CDT)
- FIPS code: 27-05608
- GNIS feature ID: 0663582

Big Bend Township is a township in Chippewa County, Minnesota, United States. The population was 257 at the 2000 census.

== History ==
Big Bend Township was organized in 1874, and was named from a meander in the Chippewa River.

== Geography ==
According to the United States Census Bureau, the township has a total area of 35.8 square miles (93 km^{2}), of which 35.7 square miles (92 km^{2}) is land and 0.04 square miles (0.10 km^{2}) (0.11%) is water.

== Demographics ==
As of the census of 2000, there were 257 people, 105 households, and 70 families residing in the township. The population density was 7.2 inhabitants per square mile (2.8/km^{2}). There were 124 housing units at an average density of 3.5 per square mile (1.4/km^{2}). The racial makeup of the township was 99.61% White and 0.39% Asian.

There were 105 households, out of which 30.5% had children under the age of 18 living with them, 61.0% were married couples living together, 1.0% had a female householder with no husband present, and 33.3% were non-families. 28.6% of all households were made up of individuals, and 14.3% had someone living alone who was 65 years of age or older. The average household size was 2.45 and the average family size was 3.07.

In the township the population was spread out, with 26.1% under the age of 18, 7.0% from 18 to 24, 23.7% from 25 to 44, 27.6% from 45 to 64, and 15.6% who were 65 years of age or older. The median age was 42 years. For every 100 females, there were 110.7 males. For every 100 females age 18 and over, there were 118.4 males.

The median income for a household in the township was $39,375, and the median income for a family was $46,563. Males had a median income of $26,250 versus $22,500 for females. The per capita income for the township was $18,435. About 1.4% of families and 4.8% of the population were below the poverty line, including 8.2% of those under the age of eighteen and 8.5% of those 65 or over.
