= Rainbow Canyon (Nevada) =

Canyon located in Lincoln County, Nevada

- Location within Nevada

Geography
- Location: Lincoln County, Nevada, United States
- Coordinates: 37.615°N 114.514°W
- Interactive map of Rainbow Canyon

Rainbow Canyon is a canyon located in Lincoln County, Nevada. It is also the location of the Rainbow Canyon Rock Art Site, which contains paintings that are around 10,000 years old.
