= Losh, Wilson and Bell =

British manufacturing company

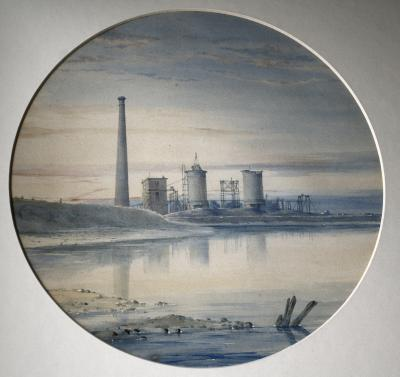
- Watercolour painting by John Bell of the Bell Ironworks under construction at Port Clarence, c. 1853
- Type: Manufacturing company
- Founded: 1809
- Founder: William Losh, Thomas Wilson, Thomas Bell
- Defunct: 1923 merged
- Successor: Dorman Long
- Headquarters: Newcastle-upon-Tyne, England
- Key people: Lowthian Bell
- Products: Iron, Soda

Losh, Wilson and Bell, later Bells, Goodman, then Bells, Lightfoot and finally Bell Brothers, was a leading Northeast England manufacturing company, founded in 1809 by the partners William Losh, Thomas Wilson, and Thomas Bell.

The firm was founded at Newcastle-upon-Tyne with an ironworks and an alkali works nearby at Walker. The alkali works were the first in England to make soda using the Leblanc process; the ironworks was the first to use Cleveland Ironstone, presaging the 1850s boom in ironmaking on Teesside.

The so-called discoverer of Cleveland Ironstone, the mining engineer John Vaughan, ran a rolling mill for the company before leaving to found the major rival firm Bolckow Vaughan. The other key figure in the company was Lowthian Bell, son of Thomas Bell; he became perhaps the best known ironmaster in England.

As Bell Brothers, the firm continued until 1931, when it was taken over by rival Dorman Long.

== History ==
=== Founders ===
The company was named after William Losh, Thomas Wilson, and Thomas Bell.

William Losh (1770 Carlisle–4 August 1861, Ellison Place, Newcastle) came from a rich family that owned coal mines in Northeast England. He was educated in Hamburg, and trained in Newcastle, Sweden and France. He married Alice Wilkinson of Carlisle on 1 March 1798 at Gateshead. He was a friend of the explorer Alexander von Humboldt and a one-time business partner of rail pioneer George Stephenson. His brother James Losh was also a partner in the firm, and kept a diary recording his anxieties about the firm during the Napoleonic Wars.

Thomas Wilson (1773–9 May 1858) of Low Fell, Gateshead joined the Losh, Lubbin counting house. In 1807, Wilson became a partner and the firm took the name Losh, Wilson and Bell. In 1810 he married Mrs Fell of Kirklinton.

Thomas Bell, (5 March 1784 – 20 April 1845) partner, was married to Katherine Lowthian of Newbiggin, Cumberland on 25 March 1815. Bell's father was a blacksmith.

=== Origins: from alkali to iron ===
The firm's origins can be traced back to 1790 when Archibald Dundonald, with John and William Losh, experimented on producing soda from salt. In about 1793 they opened a works at Bells Close, near Newcastle. Dundonald sent William Losh to Paris to study Nicolas Leblanc's process for making soda from salt. In 1807, the Loshes opened an alkali works at Walker, Newcastle upon Tyne, Northumberland. It was the first in England to use the Leblanc process. Dundonald left the partnership and the business continued as Walker Alkali Works.

Losh, Wilson & Bell's first ironworks was founded in 1809 at Walker, beside the alkali works, carrying out a mixture of engineering work but not building steam engines. By 1818, George Stephenson's original wooden wagonway was completely relaid with cast-iron edge-rails made in collaboration between Stephenson, who owned the patent, and Losh, Wilson and Bell. Around 1821, George Stephenson was briefly a partner in the Walker Ironworks.

=== Wealth ===
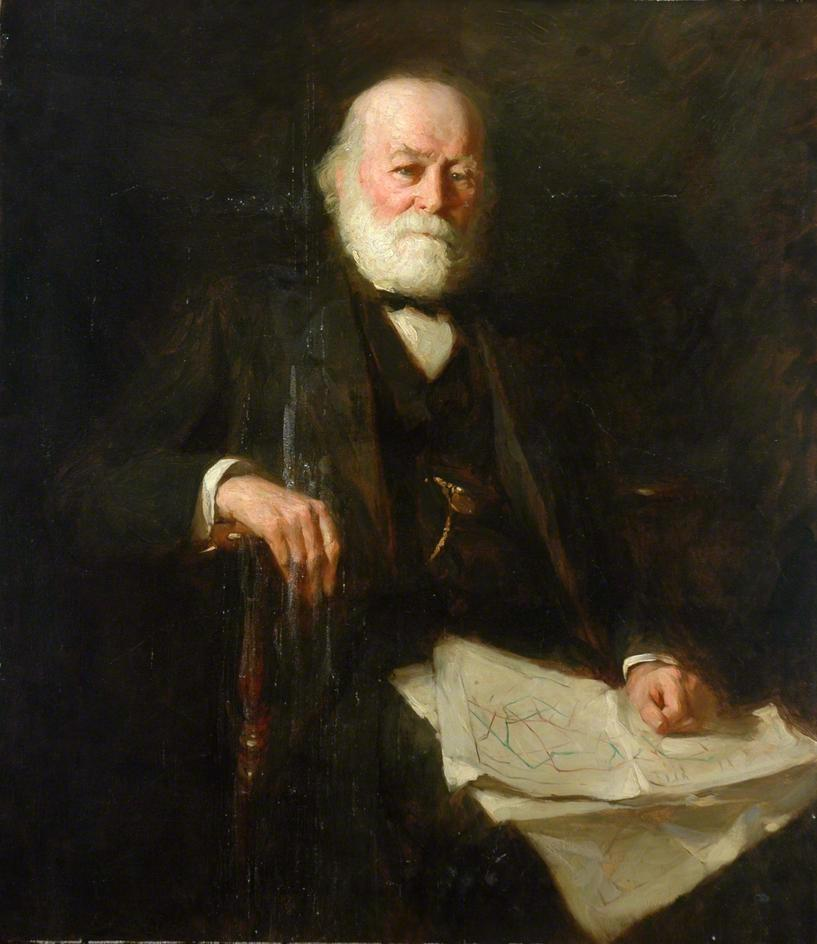
Lowthian Bell, by Frank Bramley. National Railway Museum, York

In 1827 a rolling mill capable of 100 tons of bar iron per week was installed at the Walker Ironworks; in the same year, Losh, Wilson and Bell's Walker foundry was listed in Parson and White's gazetteer of Durham and Northumberland as a steam engine manufacturer. In 1833, the iron puddling process was installed at Walker. In 1835, while working as an inspector of construction on the Whitby & Pickering Railway, Thomas Wilson noted the presence of ironstone in a railway cutting at Grosmont, and arranged for drift mines to exploit the find; the new railway carried the ore to Whitby. In that year, at the age of nineteen, Thomas Bell's son Lowthian Bell entered the firm's Newcastle office under his father. In 1836 he joined his father at the firm's ironworks at Walker.

In 1838, a second mill for rolling rails was added, run by the engineer John Vaughan (who went on to found Bolckow Vaughan); he strongly influenced Lowthian Bell to become an ironmaster. In the same year, The Athenaeum Journal reported that the Losh, Wilson & Bell works was manufacturing tin and iron plate in large quantities, along with iron bars for making railway-carriage wheels. The firm's adjacent alkali works was one of several such operations on the Tyne that were collectively producing more than 250 tons of crystallised soda and about 100 tons of soda ash weekly. The journal called William Losh "the father of soda-making on the Tyne" and described him as the head of the firm (although it was a partnership).

In 1842, the shortage of pig iron persuaded Bell to install its own blast furnace for smelting mill cinder; this was a key decision, enabling the firm to expand. Only two years later, in 1844, the firm installed a second furnace at Walker for Cleveland Ironstone from Grosmont, six years before the boom in Cleveland iron when Vaughan and Marley discovered ironstone in the Eston Hills in 1850. From 1849, Losh, Wilson and Bell were subcontractors on the Newcastle-Gateshead High Level Bridge, responsible for constructing the bridge approaches.

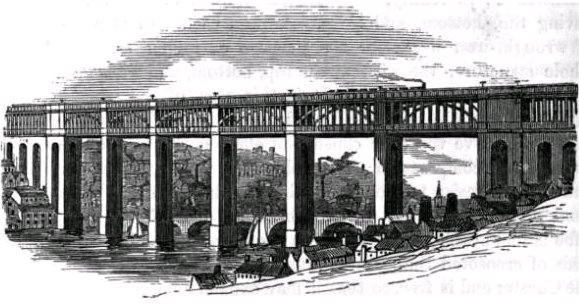
Losh, Wilson and Bell constructed the approaches for the Newcastle-Gateshead High Level Bridge, c. 1852

On 25 January 1851, Lowthian Bell left the partnership with William Losh, Thomas Wilson, Catherine Bell, Thomas Bell and John Bell. The business at that time was described in the London Gazette as "Iron Manufacturers, and Ship and Insurance Brokers, under the style or firm of Losh, Wilson, and Bell". He went on to have a career in chemistry and politics, becoming a member of parliament among many other distinctions.

On 8 October 1855, there was a serious boiler explosion at the Walker Iron Works, which killed at least seven workers. According to a contemporary account, the boiler "unfurled like a sail, was blown upwards, carrying with it two roofings of the sheds, and blowing down two furnaces, with their chimneys, and scattering the molten metal and red hot bricks around, while one end of it was hurled into the midst of the works, and the other about 200 yards over the hill top, into the lumber-yard".

All the dead were aged between 19 and 33, and the event created something of a sensation at the time. In 1857, John Marley, in his account of the Cleveland Ironstone, described the Bell Ironworks as follows:

These iron-works, situate on the Tyne, and belonging to Messrs. Losh, Wilson, & Bell, originally consisted of only one furnace, being the first blast furnace that was specially erected for this bed of ironstone (in connection with Scotch, and other ores, for mixing), viz., about the year 1842 or 1843, and which ironstone was purchased from the aforesaid mines belonging to Mrs. Clark, in the Whitby district, the first cargo being sent in June or July, 1843, since which time these works have been increased by one extra furnace, built for the Whitby district ironstone in 1844, and by other three [at Port Clarence] for the north part of Cleveland, about 1852, making now a total of five furnaces.

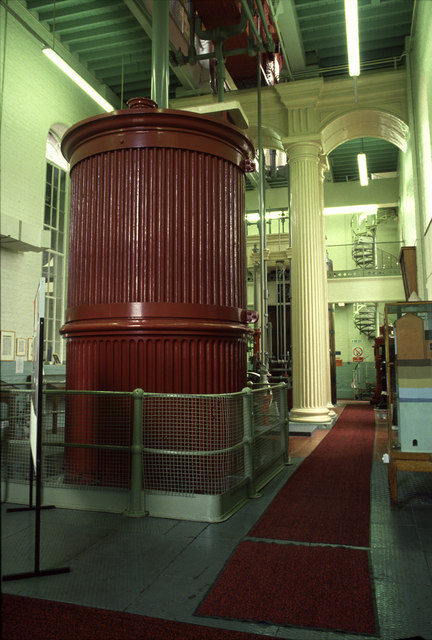
Cornish beam engine, Springhead Pumping Station: 90" engine by Bells Lightfoot

=== Bells, Goodman ===
From 1869 at the latest, the company owning the Walker Engine Works was Bells, Goodman & Co. In that year the firm made the tunnelling shield and iron castings to line the Tower subway tunnels. In 1871 the firm made pumping and winding engines for Seghill Colliery. In 1875 it made machinery to condense smoke and gases for Clyde Lead Works of Glasgow.

=== Bells, Lightfoot ===
In 1875, the Bells, Goodman partnership was dissolved when Alfred Goodman retired. The firm became known as Bells, Lightfoot & Co. In 1876 it supplied a 90" Cornish beam engine for Springhead Pumping Station near Anlaby in the East Riding of Yorkshire; it had an unusual box-section wrought iron beam, and continued running until 1952. On 30 November 1876, Thomas Bell Lightfoot, Managing Partner, was granted a patent for his developments on machines for squeezing metals into shape. However, on 28 August 1883, Thomas Bell moved to Bilbao, Spain, where he continued to describe himself as an Ironmaster, and by mutual consent his partnership with Henry Bell and Thomas Bell the younger was dissolved. The deed was witnessed on 7 December 1883.

=== Bell Brothers ===
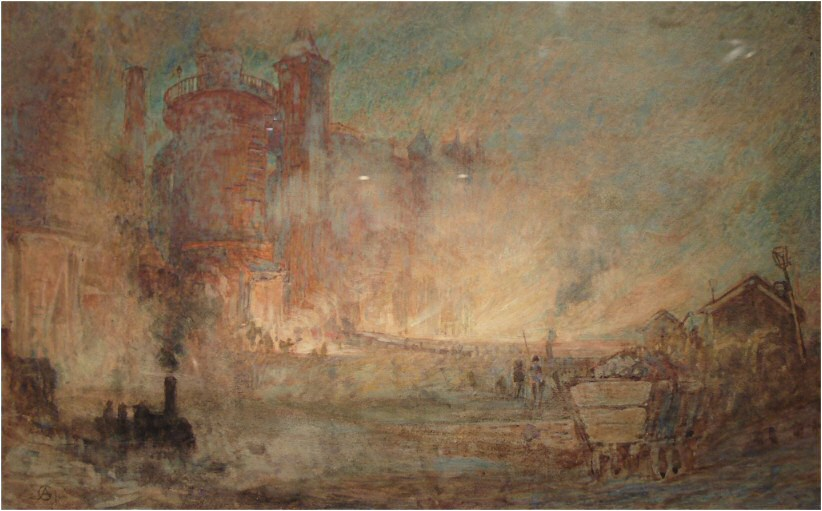
Painting of Bell Brothers Ironworks at Port Clarence by Albert Goodwin

By 1873, Bell Brothers owned 9 coal mines in County Durham and Yorkshire. There were 10 mines in 1882; in 1888 the "Clarence Salt Works" was also recorded. In 1896 and 1902 the company had 11 mines. In 1914 there are 12; in 1921 there are 14. The 1881–1891 Arts and Crafts classical style Bell Brothers office building at Zetland Road in Middlesbrough was designed by architect Philip Webb; it was his only commercial development. According to English Heritage it is architecturally the most important building in Middlesbrough.

In 1903, Lowthian Bell, then aged 87, sold a majority holding of the Bell companies to the rival firm Dorman Long. It was not a comfortable merger. Bell Brothers, along with the plate maker Consett Iron Company and another family ironmaking firm of Northeast England, Bolckow Vaughan,

had expanded their capacity during World War I and the boom that immediately followed. As in other regions, expansion had come in a piecemeal fashion. Inefficient plant, excess capacity, and low profits had increased these firms' debts and brought creditors onto their boards.

— Alfred Chandler

Further, as regards the Bells and the Dormans,

Over the years the two families rarely agreed as to how the firm should be run. Indeed, the company was known locally not as Dorman Long but as "Dorman versus Bell".

— Alfred Chandler

Bell Brothers was recorded in the Colliery Year Book and Coal Trades Directory of 1923 as having an annual output of 600,000 tons of coal for coking and manufacturing. Sir Hugh Bell was chairman and managing director; Arthur Dorman and Charles Dorman were directors. That same year, Bell Brothers, described in The Sydney Morning Herald as "owners of coal and ironstone mines and blast furnaces and rolling mills", was finally merged completely with Dorman Long. Sir Arthur Dorman was chairman; both Hugh Bell and his son Maurice Bell were among the directors. When Arthur Dorman died in 1931, Hugh Bell, aged 87, briefly became chairman of 'Dorman versus Bell'; he died on 29 June 1931.

== Wages and social conditions ==
John Roby Leifchild wrote a report in 1842 for the Children's Employment Commission entitled "Employment of Children and Young Persons in the Collieries, Lead Mines, and Iron Works of Northumberland and the North of Durham; and on the Condition, Treatment, and Education of such Children and Young Persons". Leifchild found that Losh, Wilson & Bell paid its workers 30 to 36 shillings per week for a scrap-puddler; £2 5 shillings per week for a pudler; 18 shillings per week for a plate mill-furnace man; and 25 shillings per week for an engineman. The boiler engineer's family of wife and four children spent 18 shillings per week on provisions and 3 shillings per week on rent, leaving only 4 shillings for all other expenditure.

In sport, an iron puddler, Robert Chambers of the company's Walker works, won the sculling championship at the 1857 Thames Regatta. The heavy work stirring the iron was said to have strengthened his arms and shoulders. Chambers also won the return match, held on the Tyne on 19 April 1859, even after a collision with a moored boat left him a hundred yards behind.

== See also ==
- Hartley Colliery disaster

== Bibliography ==
- "Bell Of Rounton Grange Records 1693–1956". North Yorkshire County Council Archives: online catalogue. North Yorkshire County Council. pp. Ref. ZFK.
- Jeans, J. S. (1875). Pioneers of the Cleveland iron trade. H.C. Reid.
- Marley, J. Cleveland Ironstone. Outline of the Main Or Thick Stratified Bed, Its Discovery, Application, And Results, In Connection with the Iron-Works in the North of England Transactions of the North of England Institute of Mining Engineers 5 1856-57, 165-223
