= Teesside =

Conurbation in England

- Built-up area
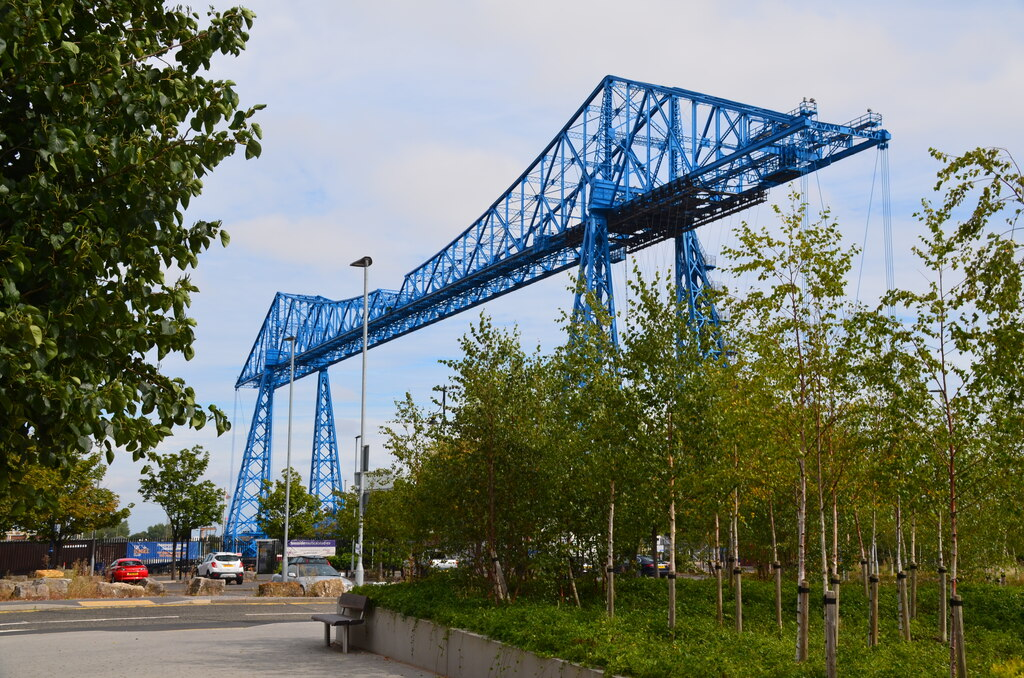
- The Tees Transporter Bridge, a local landmark and icon of Teesside

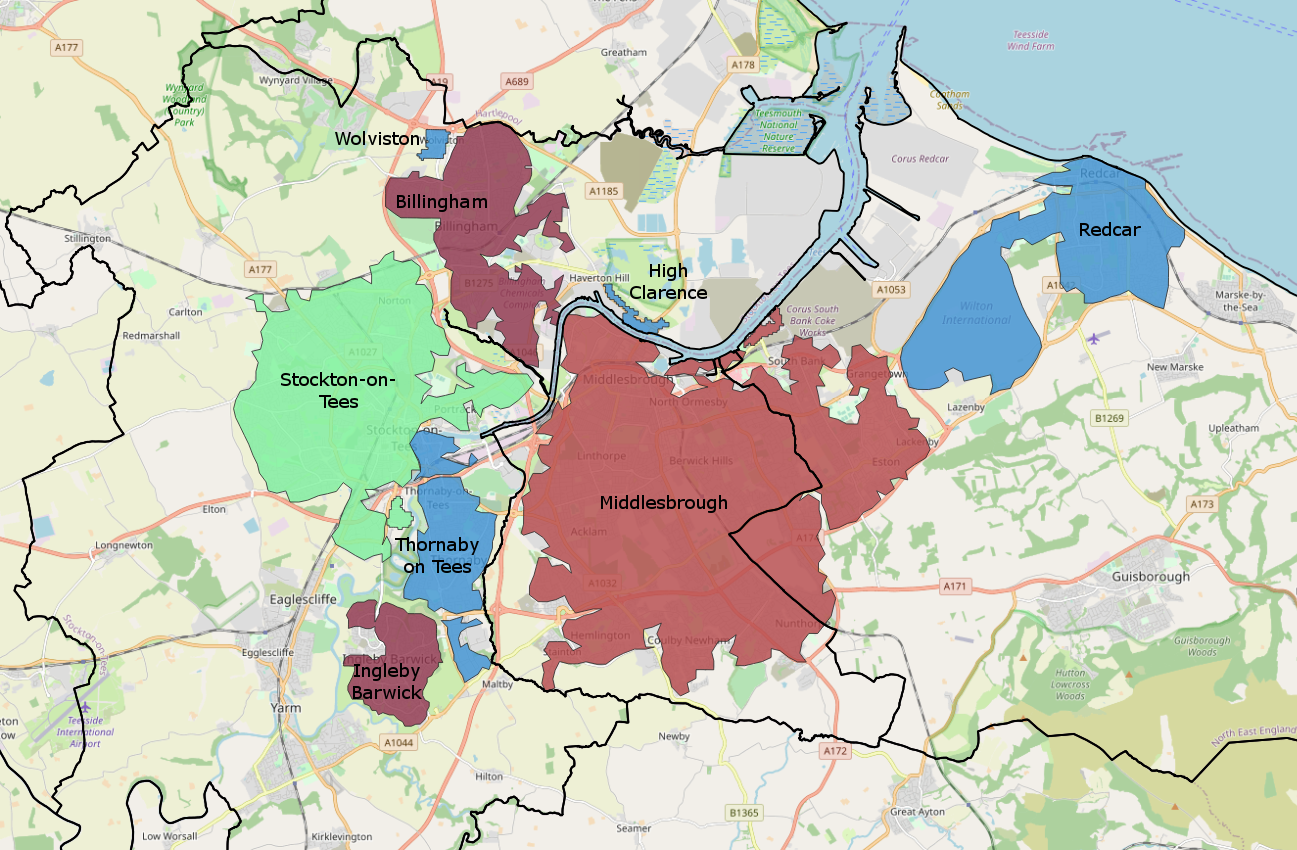
- A map of the Teesside urban area

- Location of Teesside in northern England
- Coordinates: 54°35′20″N 1°11′15″W
- Sovereign state: United Kingdom
- Country: England
- Region: North East England
- Ceremonial county: County Durham; North Yorkshire
- Sub divisions: Borough of Middlesbrough; Borough of Stockton-on-Tees; Borough of Redcar and Cleveland
- County Borough of Teesside: 1968–1974

Population
  - Total: 376,633
  - Rank: 18th
- Time zone: GMT (UTC)
  - Summer (DST): UTC+1 (BST)
- Postcodes: TS1–8 & 10–27

Teesside (/ˈtiːsaɪd/) is an urban area around the River Tees in North East England. Straddling the border between County Durham and North Yorkshire, it spans the boroughs of Middlesbrough, Stockton-on-Tees and Redcar and Cleveland. In 2011, it was the eighteenth-largest urban area in the United Kingdom. It forms part of the wider Tees Valley area, which also includes the boroughs of Darlington and Hartlepool.

Towns on Teesside include Middlesbrough, Stockton-on-Tees, Billingham, Redcar, Thornaby-on-Tees, and Ingleby Barwick. The local economy was once dominated by heavy manufacturing until deindustrialisation in the latter half of the 20th century.

== History ==
=== 1968–1974: County borough ===
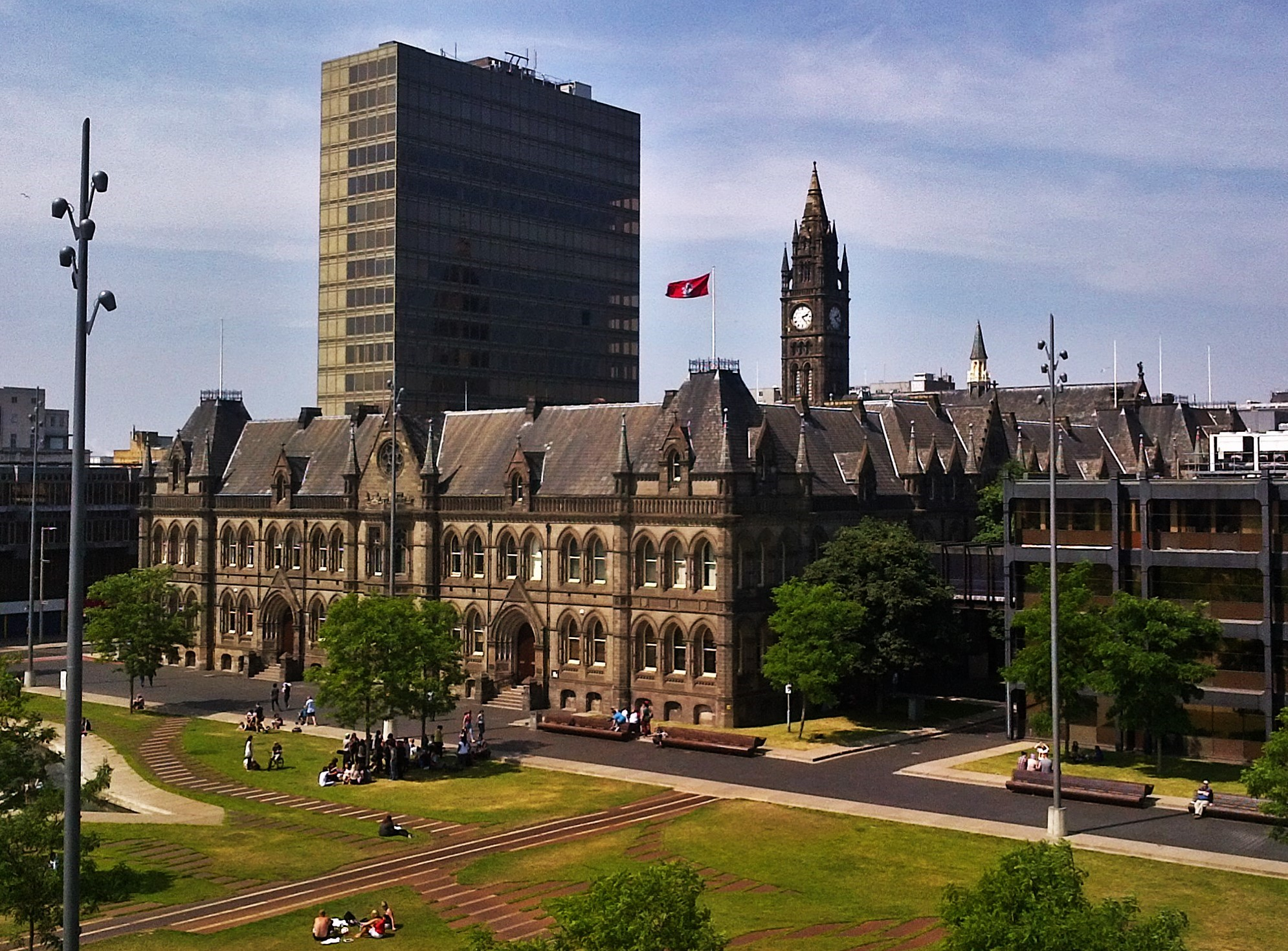
Middlesbrough Town Hall, built in 1889

Before the county of Cleveland was created, the area (including Stockton-on-Tees) existed as a part of the North Riding of Yorkshire, due to most land being south of the Tees. Teesside was created due to Stockton-on-Tees being linked heavily with Thornaby (which had amalgamated with South Stockton/Mandale to form the Borough of Thornaby), Middlesbrough and Redcar by industry.

Compared to the modern Teesside conurbation, the area was smaller, then excluding towns such as Hartlepool, Ingleby Barwick and Yarm, the latter two being in the Stokesley Rural District until Cleveland was created. The Teesside name is still used as a synonym for Tees Valley with most signage and local business retaining the name.

=== 1969: Redcliffe-Maud Report ===
The Royal Commission, proposed in the Redcliffe-Maud Report, a large unitary authority called Teesside. It would have covered what came to be the County of Cleveland in addition to Whitby and Stokesley.

=== 1974–1996: Non-metropolitan county ===
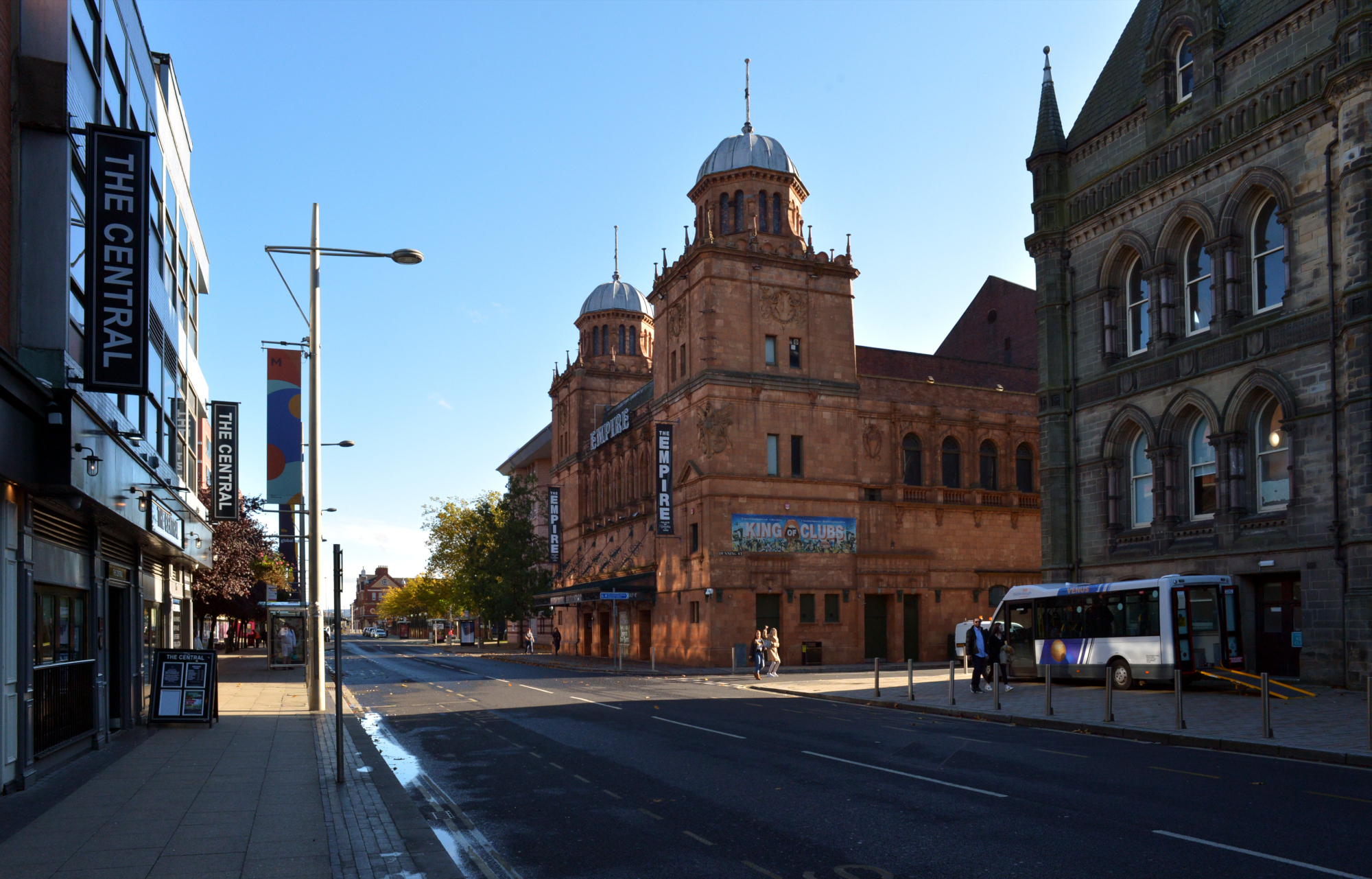
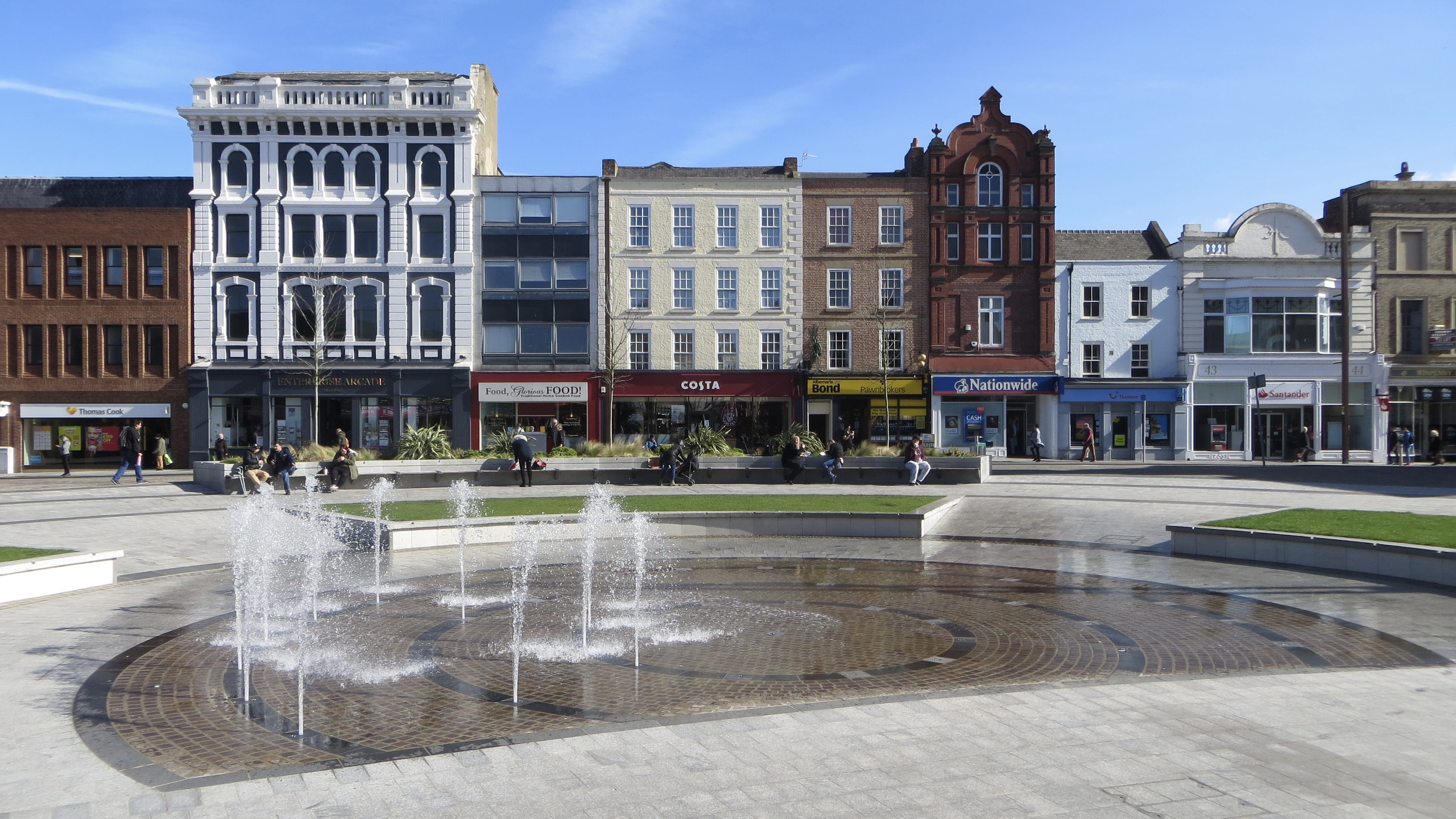
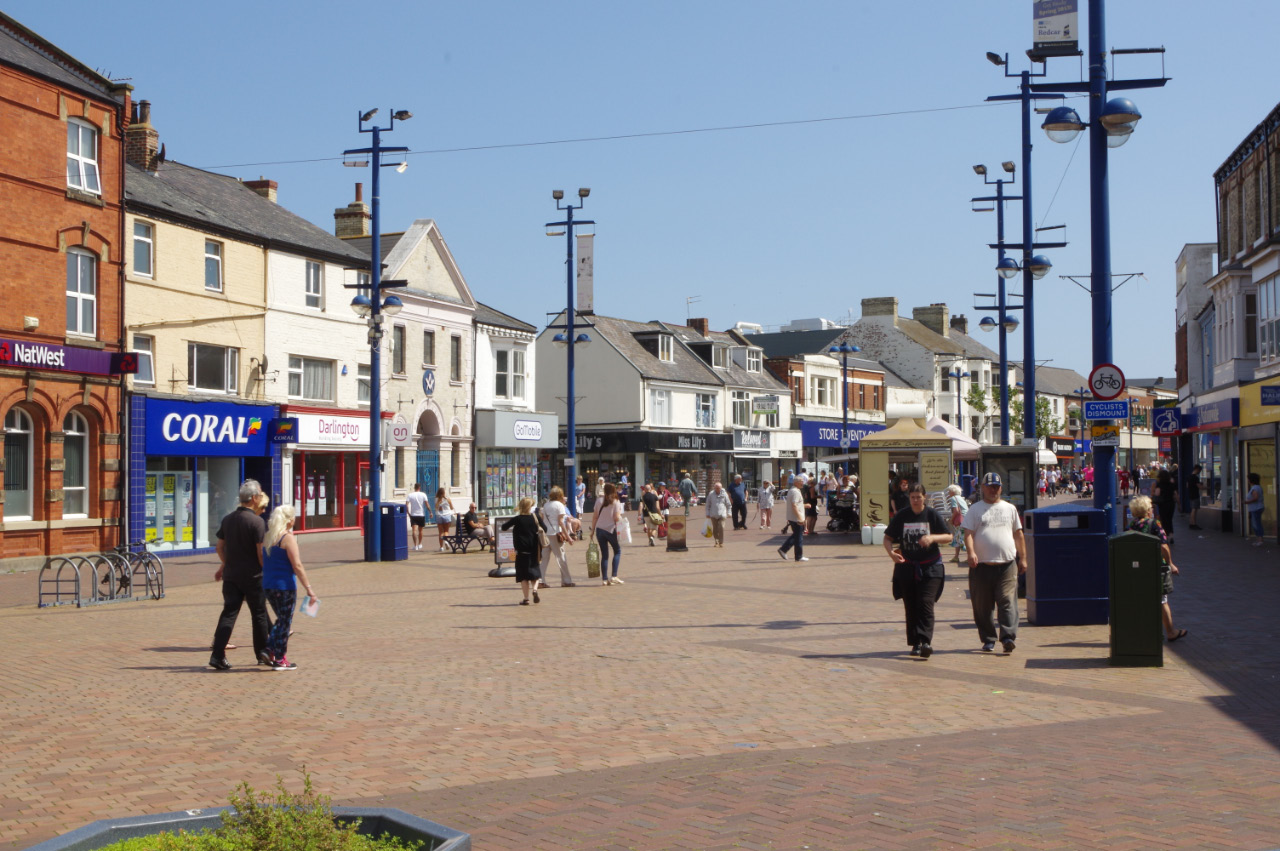
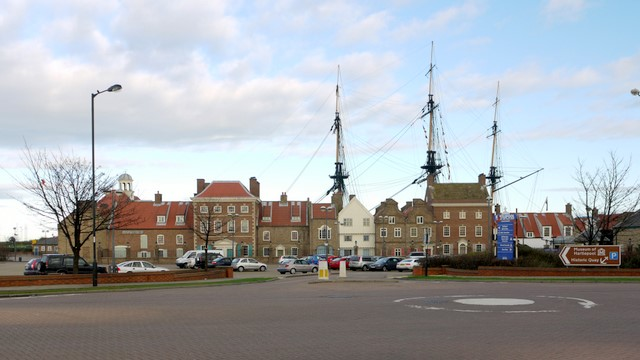
Middlesbrough, Stockton-on-Tees, Redcar and Hartlepool

The County of Cleveland was created in 1974. It was smaller and included a county and four borough councils than the Redcliffe-Maud report's single council.

The name was also changed from Teesside to Cleveland as the report's area South of the River Tees corresponded to the Langbaurgh Wapentake, which had the alternative name of Cleveland. Cleveland Police was retained, along with other institutions covering the four boroughs. Each borough became a unitary authority with the county council abolished in 1996.

=== From 2016: Mayoralty ===
In 1998 the neighbouring Borough of Darlington gained unitary authority status. Tees Valley was initially a statistical sub-region of North East England across the four former Cleveland boroughs and the Borough of Darlington.

This name and area carried over to an enterprise partnership formed in 2011 and a combined authority created in 2016, twenty years after the abolition of the Cleveland county. The authority is headed by a mayor, presently William Boyle.

== Demography ==
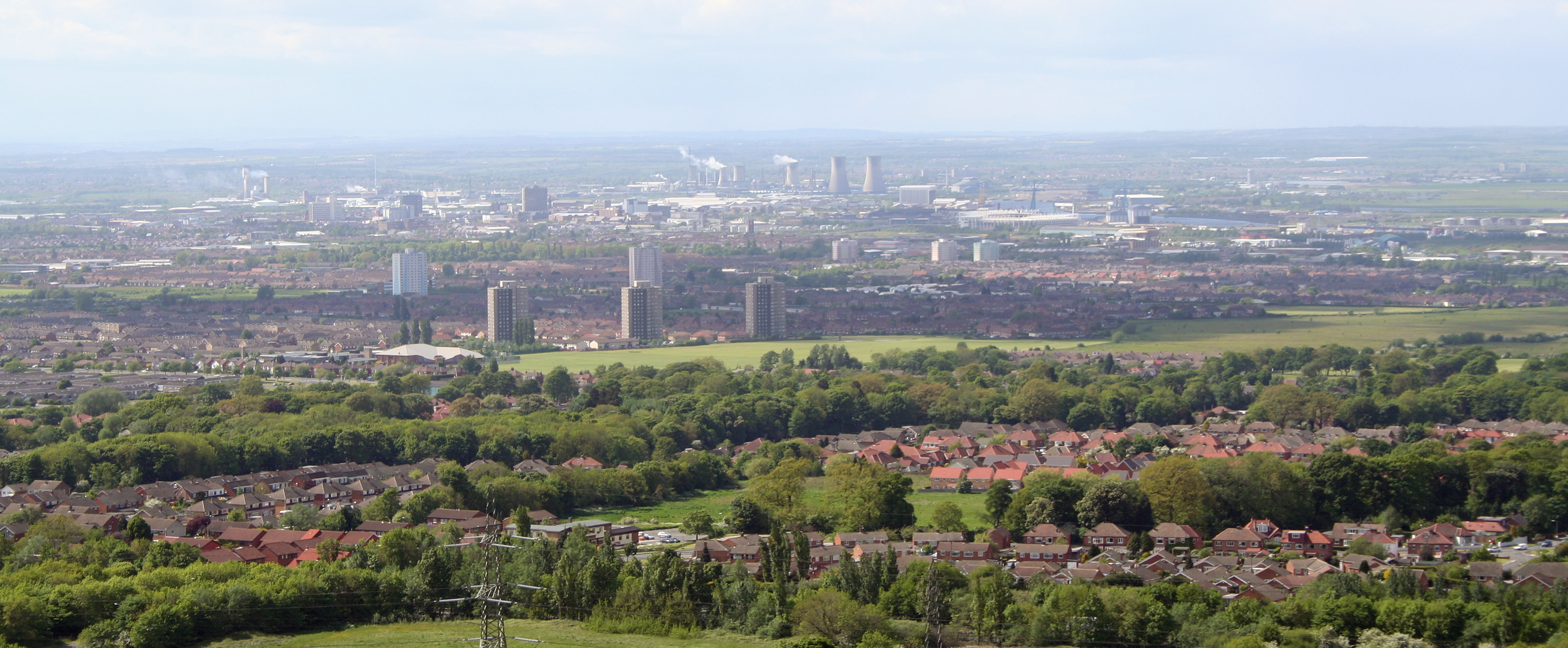
A panoramic view over Teesside

The Teesside Built-up Area (BUA), previously the Teesside Urban Area in 2001, identified by the ONS for statistical purposes had a population of 376,633 in the 2011 census, up 3% on the 2001 figure of 365,323.

It has the following subdivisions:

- North Tees
  - Stockton-on-Tees (82,792)
  - Billingham (35,392)
  - Wolviston (877)
  - High Clarence (773)
- South Tees
  - Middlesbrough (174,700)
  - Redcar (37,073)
  - Thornaby-on-Tees (24,741)
  - Ingleby Barwick (20,378)

Eaglescliffe (north) and Yarm (south) are counted as a separate Yarm urban area, separated by a narrow gap, which had a population of 19,184 in the 2011 census, up 5% from the 2001 figure of 18,335. Infilling development may join the two urban areas together. Marske-by-the-Sea is another separate Urban Area nearly contiguous with Redcar with a population of 8,282, down 7% from the 2001 figure of 8,921.

The nearby Hartlepool built-up area is sometimes grouped with the area, due to it previously being in Cleveland county. The Hartlepool area has an urban population of 88,855 an increase of 3% from the 2001 figure of 86,085. This can be referred to as the Teesside & Hartlepool Urban Area. If this definition is taken into consideration, with the addition of the Eaglescliffe area and Marske, Teesside would have a population of approximately 492,954 people.

== Process industries ==
Teesside industry is dominated by the commodity and integrated chemical producers in the North East of England Process Industry Cluster (NEPIC). These companies are based on three large chemical sites at Wilton, Billingham and Seal Sands. These companies make products such as petrochemicals, commodity chemicals, fertilizers and polymers.

=== Salt ===
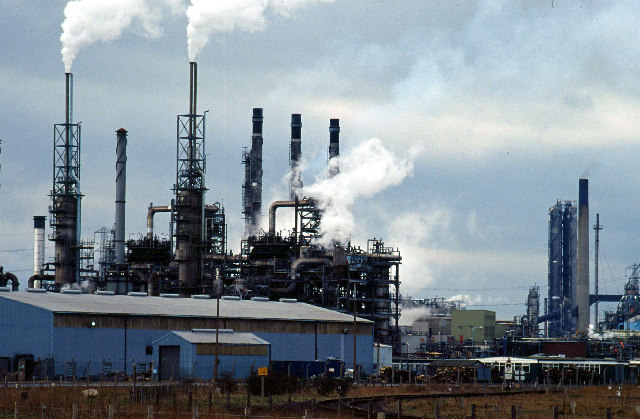
Seal Sands

Salt extraction for human consumption and had taken place at Seal Sands since Roman times through the use of panning. This continued throughout the 20th century and left caverns which are now used as liquid/gas storage facilities for the process industry.

In 1859, rock salt deposits were discovered in Middlesbrough by Henry Bolckow and Vaughan while boring for water. This led to heavy chemical industry moving to the area.

Salt works were established at Haverton Hill in 1882 by the Bell Brothers. It was the first firm to begin large scale salt production in the area, this required some workers in from Cheshire. Salt-making interests of the Bell Brothers were bought by Brunner Mond & Co of Cheshire in 1890. Brunner Mond became a giant of the area's chemical-making in the late 19th and early 20th centuries.

During the 20th century, salt extraction on the Tees's north bank, by aqueous hydraulic means, resulted in a number of underground salt cavities that are impervious to gas and liquids. Consequently, these cavities are now used to store both industrial gases and liquids by companies which are members of the Northeast of England Process Industry Cluster (NEPIC).

Today Venator Materials is based close to Greatham, operating one of the world's largest chemical plants for titanium dioxide manufacturing. It is a white pigment used in paints, Polo mints, cosmetics, UV sunscreens, plastics, golf balls, the white part of a traffic cone and sports field line markings.

=== Alkali ===
In 1860, William James established an alkali company at Cargo Fleet. In 1869, Samuel Sadler set up a factory nearby. Sadler's works produced synthetic aniline and alzarin dyestuffs and distilled tar. The introduction of the Solvay Process to make alkali in 1872 made nearby Tyneside alkali industry uneconomical but helped Teesside industry which was invigorated by the discovery of further salt deposits at Port Clarence near Seal Sands by Bell Brothers in 1874.

=== Ammonia ===
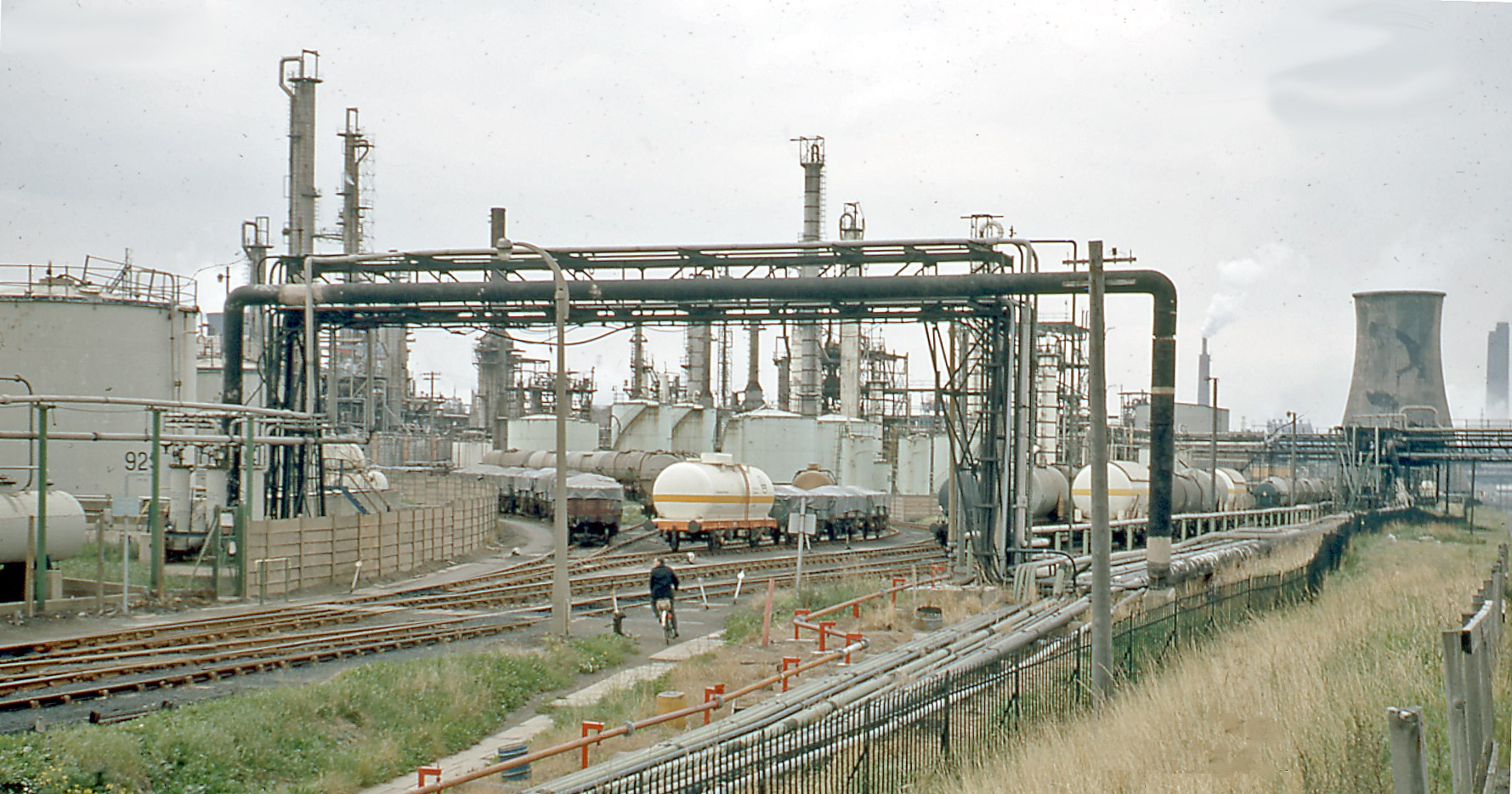
The Billingham ex-ICI chemical complex

In 1918, the chemical industry was established at Billingham by the Government for the production of synthetic ammonia, for the manufacture of munitions during the Great War. The 700 acre Grange Farm at Billingham was chosen for the site. By the time the plant opened the war was over, and its manufacturing techniques outdated. In 1920, it was taken over by Brunner Mond and manufactured synthetic ammonia and fertilisers. In 1926, Brunner Mond merged with other large scale chemical manufacturers to form Imperial Chemical Industries (ICI).

=== Sulphuric acid and fertilisers ===
Teesside's first chemical works was when Robert Wilson produced sulfuric acid and fertilisers at Urlay Nook near Egglescliffe in 1833.

In 1928, anhydrite was mined from below Billingham for making sulfuric acid, a component for detergent and fertilizer manufacturing. Ammonia and fertiliser works are operated by CF Fertilisers.

=== Plastics and nylon ===
Billingham's plastic manufacturing began in 1934. This was one of the earliest sites in the world where large-scale manufacture of these materials took place. Another chemical plant was established the following year to make oil and petrol from creosote and coal by a process called hydrogenation. In 1946, another large chemical works opened on Teesside at Wilton, on the south side of the River Tees. In 1962, further lands were purchased by ICI at Seal Sands, where land had been reclaimed from the sea, becoming the third large-scale chemical manufacturing site on Teesside.

Today all three Teesside chemical sites at Billingham, Wilton, and Seal Sands remain in use for large-scale chemical manufacture by the members of the Northeast of England Process Industry Cluster (NEPIC), and plastics and polymers continue to be manufactured there by AEQUITA (LDPE), Victrex (PEEK) and Lucite International (Perspex). Nylon 66 manufacture ceased on Teesside in 2008 with the Invista manufacturing unit closed.

=== Petrochemical ===
Coke ovens used in chemical production at Billingham were replaced in 1962 by plants using the steam naphtha process, which enabled use of crude oil as feedstock for a process known as cracking. This proved to be a much cheaper way to produce ethylene, aromatics, petroleum derivatives and other chemicals such as ammonia. From 1964 to 1969 four large oil refineries were erected at the mouth of the Tees, two by Phillips Petroleum and one each by ICI and Shell. Their main purpose was to supply Billingham's chemical industry.

In 1968, a 138-mile (222 km) pipeline was built for the transport of ethylene and linked chemical works on Teesside, with chemical plants at Runcorn. Today, ConocoPhillips operate oil refinery sites while Ensus Energy and Harvest Energy have biorefineries, the latter two produce biodiesel and bioethanol as transport fuels. SABIC operated the ethylene cracker Olefins 6 at Wilton until 2020, when it was shutdown for feedstock modifications. The plant was subsequently mothballed in 2025 due to rising energy prices. The firm eventually sold its Teesside site assets to German investment firm AEQUITA in 2026.

== Metal works ==
John Marley, discoverer of the Cleveland Ironstone which led to the enormous growth of the iron industry in the North East of England

Before 1846, Walbottle, Elswick, Birtley, Ridsdale, Hareshaw, Wylam, Consett, Stanhope, Crookhall, Tow-Law and Witton Park all had iron works. The discovery of a rich seam of iron ore to the south of the region gradually drew iron and steel manufacture towards Teesside.

In 1850, iron ore was discovered in the Cleveland Hills near Eston to the south of Middlesbrough, and iron gradually replaced coal as the lifeblood of Eston. The ore was discovered by geologist John Marley and first used by John Vaughan, the principal ironmaster of Middlesbrough who along with his German business partner Henry Bolckow had already established a small iron foundry and rolling mill using iron stone from Durham and the Yorkshire coast. In 1851, the new discovery prompted them to build Teesside's first blast furnace. Many more iron works followed, such as those built in the region by Losh, Wilson and Bell (see Sir Issac Lowthian Bell), who in 1853 were operating 5 furnaces in the region.

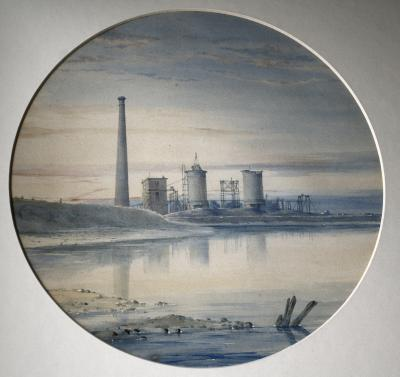
A watercolour painting of the Bell Ironworks under construction at Port Clarence, by John Bell, 1853

By 1873, the success of John Vaughan and Henry Bolckow's first blast furnace meant that Middlesbrough was producing 2 million tonnes of pig iron a year. Iron was in big demand in Britain in the late 19th century, particularly for the rapid expansion of the railways. More and more blast furnaces were opened in the vicinity of Middlesbrough to meet this demand. By the end of the century, Teesside was producing about a third of the nation's iron output.

In 1862, Middlesbrough, which became known by its nickname "Ironopolis", was visited by then prime minister William Ewart Gladstone, who said "This remarkable place, the youngest child of England's enterprise, is an infant, but if an infant, an infant Hercules". By the 1870s, steel, a much stronger and more resilient metal, was in big demand. Middlesbrough had to compete with Sheffield as the major producer. In 1875, Bolckow and Vaughan opened the first Bessemer Steel plant in Middlesbrough and the River Tees then become known as "The Steel River" leaving its old nickname "Ironopolis" behind.

In 1881, Hugh Reid (Liberal politician) described how "The iron of Eston has diffused itself all over the world. it furnishes the railways of the world; it runs by neapolitan and papal dungeons; it startles the bandit in his haunt in cicilia; it crosses over the plains of Africa; it stretches over the plains of India. it has crept out of the Cleveland Hills where it has slept since Roman days, and now like a strong and invincible serpent, coils itself around the world"

By 1929 the great depression began to affect Britain. Bolckow-Vaughan merged with neighbour Dorman-Long & Co., who then became Britain's biggest iron and steel maker and employed 33,000 people. In 1954, the post-war boom saw Dorman-Long build a state of the art steelworks at Lackenby and then new blast furnaces at Clay Lane. In 1967, Dorman-Long became part of the nationalized British Steel Corporation as production boomed in Britain. In 1979, the largest blast furnace in Europe was erected at BSC's new Redcar plant. This plant was acquired and operated by Corus, Tata Steel and then Sahaviriya Steel Industries (SSI), who are still the plant operating today.

=== British Steel Industrial Archive ===
The British Steel Collection, now housed at Teesside University, contains the records of over forty iron and steel companies based in the Teesside area of the North East of England and covers the period c. 1840–1970. The history of Teesside and its rapid growth during the 19th century is directly linked to the expansion of the railways from Darlington and Stockton towards the mouth of the Tees estuary, and the discovery of ironstone in the Cleveland Hills which attracted iron companies to the area.

The British Steel Collection archives the company records of iron and steel companies such as Bolckow & Vaughan, Bell Brothers, Cochrane & Co. Ltd., Dorman, Long & Co. Ltd., South Durham Steel & Iron Co. Ltd., Cargo Fleet Iron Company and Skinningrove Iron Co. Ltd. With records of associated institutions such as the Middlesbrough Exchange Co. Ltd. and the Cleveland Mineowners' Association also being preserved.

== Uses in local culture ==
Teesside continues to be used locally to refer to the entire urban area and the name can still be seen in the following uses:

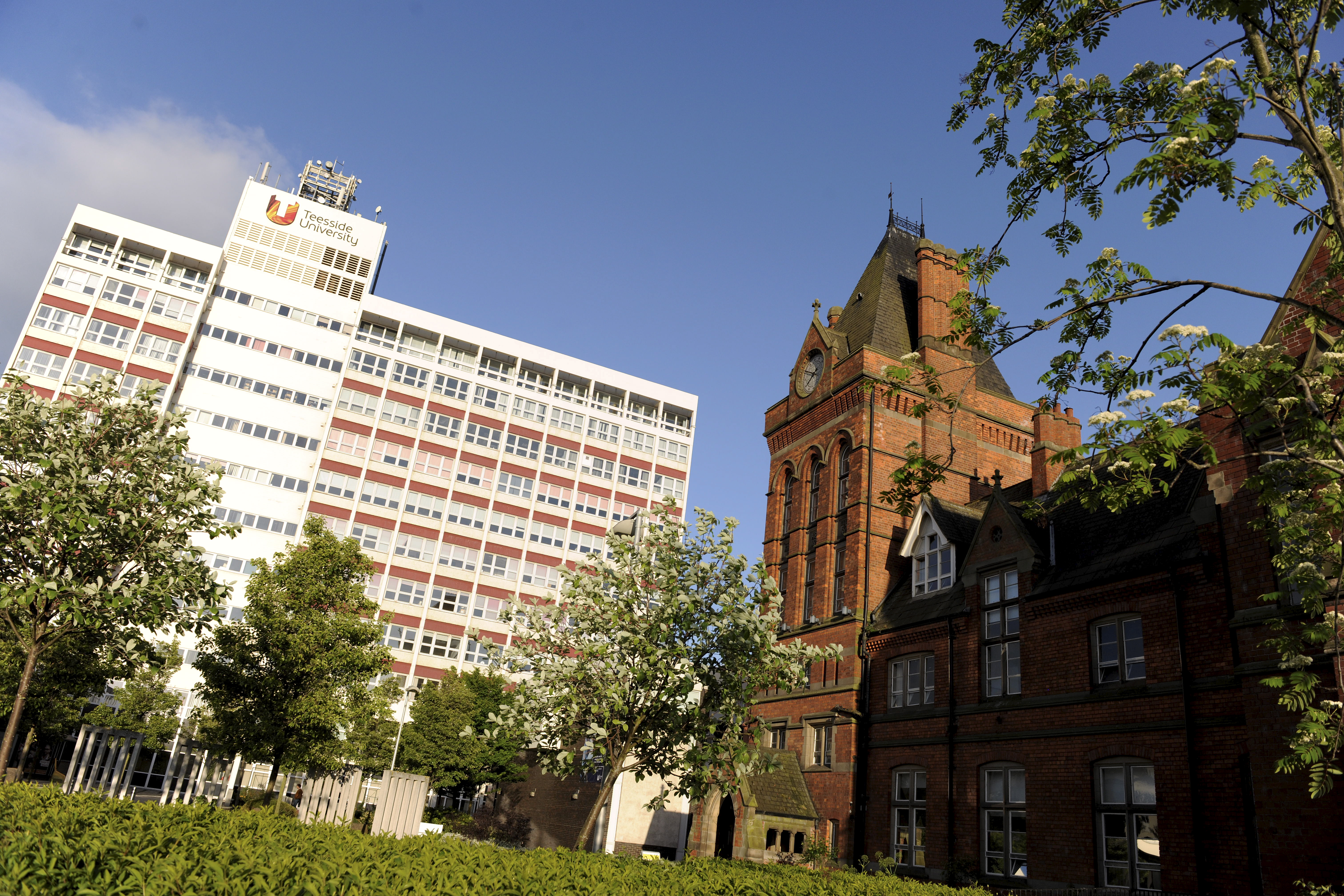
Teesside University

- Teesside University
- Teesside retail and leisure park which was founded by the now defunct Teesside Development Corporation
- Teesside International Airport and Teesside Airport railway station, the local airport and railway station serving the airport
- BBC Radio Tees broadcast across the area from its studios located in Middlesbrough
- Local TV Teesside, a local-based television channel
- TeessideLive, online version of The Gazette, a regional newspaper
- Teesside 3t Training centre, long-standing processing and heavy industries
- ’T-Side’, a clothing brand featuring iconic parts of the area.
- Teesside continues to be used as signed destination on UK road signs. It is only once the boroughs are entered that local town names are used. This is due to the County Borough of Teesside being active during the building of multiple roads at the time.

It has also been adopted for various other purposes as a synonym for the former county of Cleveland.

== See also ==
- Carbon storage in the North Sea
- Gilkes Wilson and Company
- Teesdale
- Teesport
- Teesside Fettlers
- Trolleybuses in Teesside
