= Dorman Long =

British steel company

Dorman Long & Co.
- Trade name: Dorman Long
- Industry: Manufacturing
- Founded: 1875; 151 years ago
- Headquarters: Middlesbrough, UK
- Products: Steel and Bridges

Dorman Long & Co was a UK steel producer and mine owner, later diversifying into bridge building. The company was once listed on the London Stock Exchange.

== History ==
The company was founded by Arthur Dorman and Albert de Lande Long when they acquired West Marsh Iron Works in 1875. In the 1920s, Dorman Long took over the concerns of Bell Brothers and Bolckow and Vaughan, and diversified into the construction of bridges.

Between 1923 and 1960, the company owned and operated multiple collieries in County Durham.

In 1938, Ellis Hunter took over as Managing Director and he continued to lead the business until 1961.

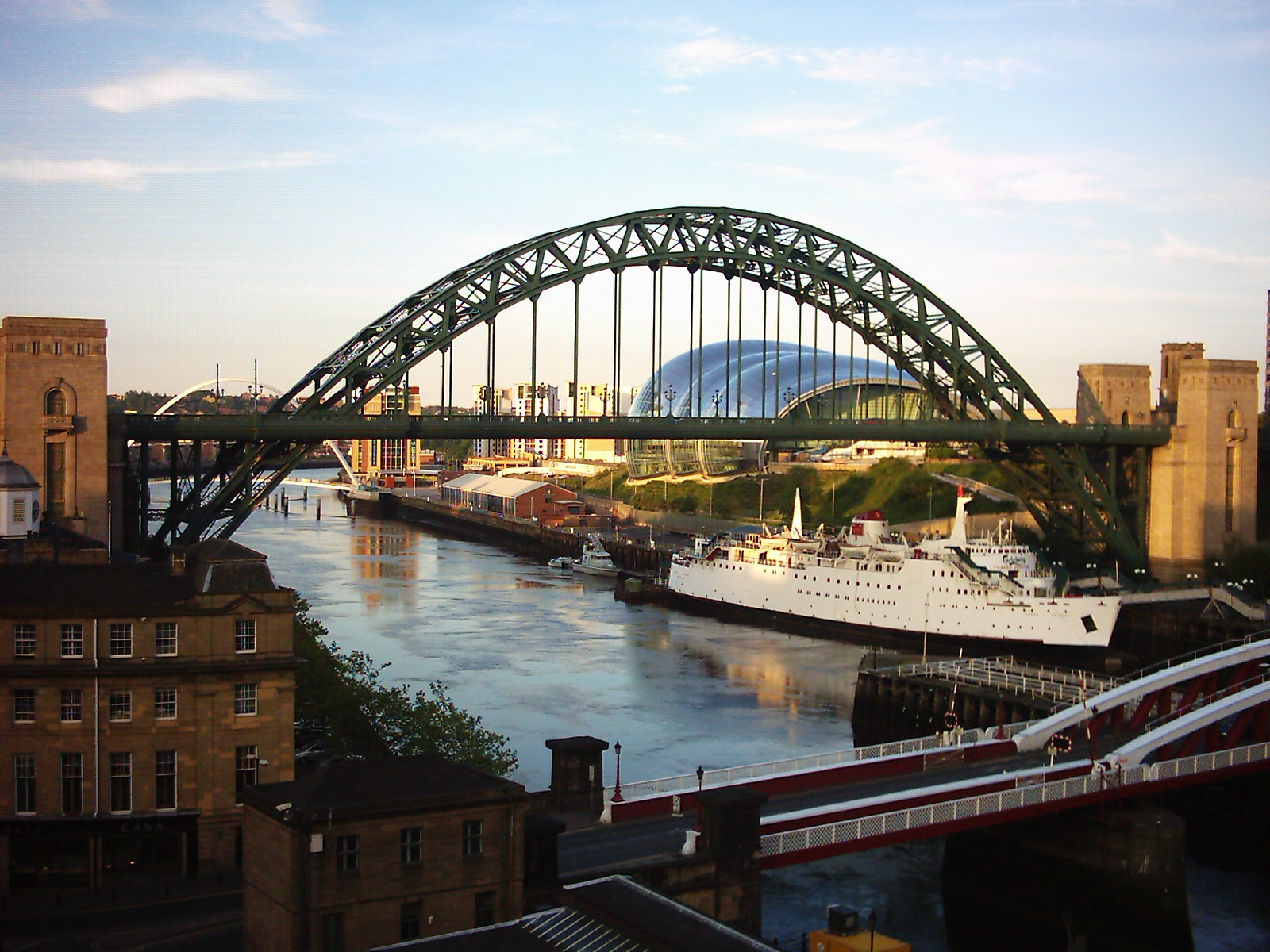
Tyne Bridge

In 1967, Dorman Long was nationalised, along with 13 other British steel-making firms, becoming subsumed into the government-owned British Steel Corporation. In 1982, Redpath Dorman Long, the engineering part of the business, was acquired by Trafalgar House which, in 1990, merged it into the Cleveland Bridge & Engineering Company in Darlington.

== Iron and steel ==
Iron-making has been known in Cleveland since the Romans found iron slags in North Yorkshire, with small-scale iron-making known to have taken place at Rievaulx and Whitby Abbeys and at Gisborough Priory in the 17th century.

Some of the key events connected with iron-making in Cleveland:

1837: The first Cleveland ironstone mine opens, at Grosmont, for the Losh, Wilson and Bell ironworks.

1841: Bolckow and Vaughan open the first ironworks in Middlesbrough.

1850: 8 June – The Discovery of the Cleveland Main Seam of Ironstone at Eston by Ironmaster John Vaughan and mining engineer John Marley both of Bolckow & Vaughan. The Cleveland iron rush begins.

1865: 30 blast furnaces operate within six miles (10 km) of Middlesbrough and one million tonnes per annum (TPA) of iron are produced to make the area one of the world's major centres of iron production.

1879: Sidney Gilchrist Thomas arrives in Cleveland and introduces the first commercial steel.

1903: Partial amalgamation of Bell companies with Dorman Long.

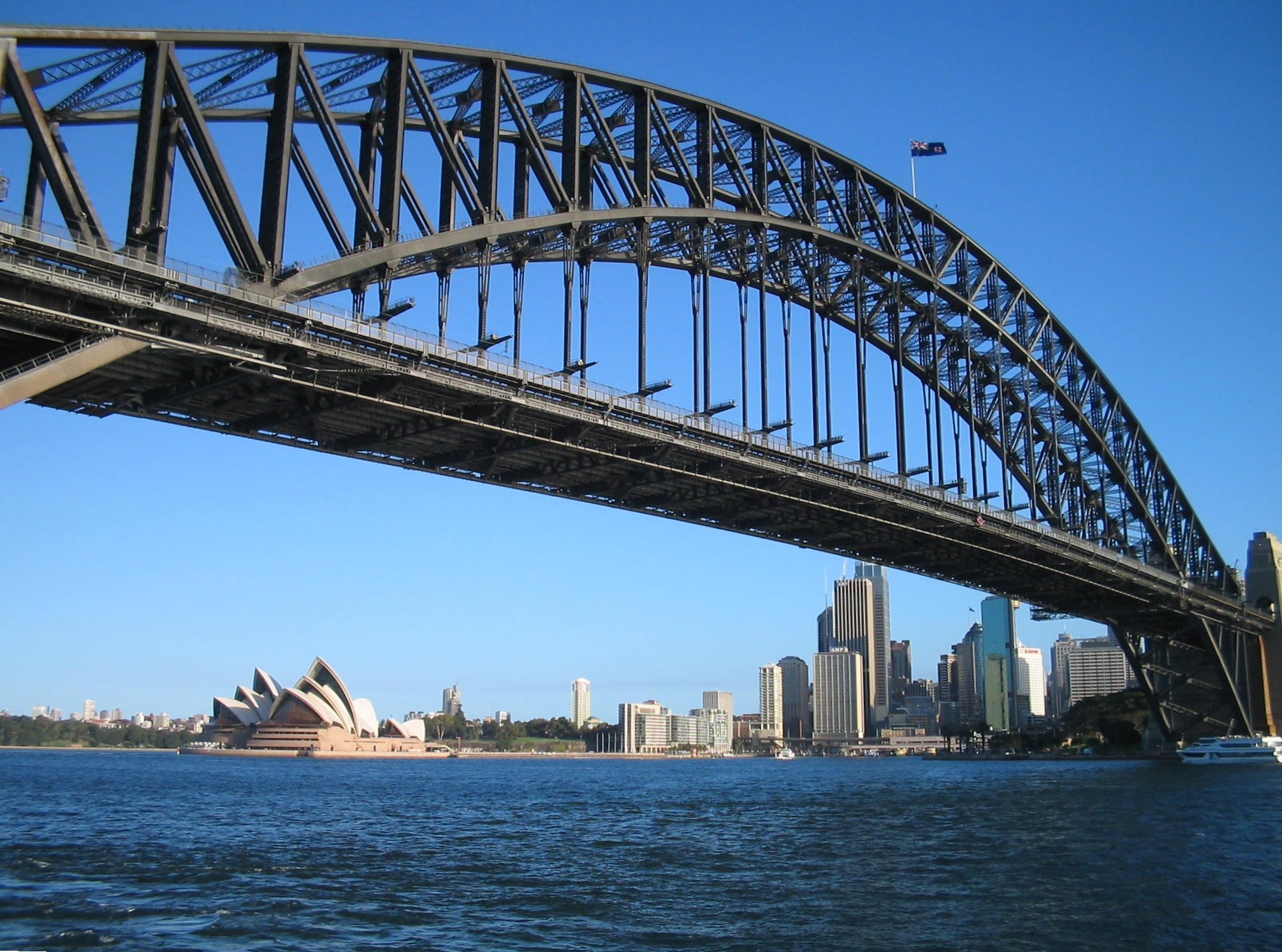
Sydney Harbour Bridge and Opera House

1917: The Redcar steel plant is opened, making steel in the open hearth process.

1928-9: Dorman Long takes over residues of Bell and Bolckow Vaughan.

1946: Dorman Long purchases 600 acres (2.4 km^{2}) of land between the Redcar and Cleveland Works to build the Lackenby development.

1955: The Dorman Long tower, a combined coal silo, firefighting water tower, and control room, was built on the Teesside steelworks site.

1967: Dorman Long, South Durham Steel Iron Co, and Stewarts and Lloyds come together to create British Steel and Tube Ltd.

1967: The steel industry is nationalised and the British Steel Corporation is born.

1989: Company is privatised becoming British Steel plc.

1990: Merged with The Cleveland Bridge & Engineering Company, Darlington.

1999: British Steel plc merges with the Dutch steel and aluminium company Koninklijke Hoogovens to become Corus Group.

2015: Former Dorman Long Steel plant on Teesside ceased production after SSI mothballed the Redcar works following a global downturn in the price of steel and later announced its UK arm had gone into liquidation.

2021: Cleveland Bridge goes into administration.

2021: The Dorman Long tower is demolished, despite its Grade II listed status.

== Bridge building ==
The most famous bridge ever constructed by a Teesside company was Dorman Long's Sydney Harbour Bridge of 1932, of similar construction to but, contrary to popular belief, not modelled on the 1928 Tyne Bridge, a construction regarded as the symbol of Tyneside's Geordie pride, but also a product of Dorman Long's Teesside workmanship. The greatest example of Dorman Long's work in Teesside itself is the single-span Newport Lifting Bridge (a Grade II Listed Building). Opened by the Duke of York in February 1934, it was England's first vertical lift bridge.

=== List of bridges constructed ===
The following is a list of some of the bridges built by the Dorman Long: it is not fully comprehensive.

Bridge	Location	Year	Total length		Notes	Image	Ref
Bridge	Location	Year	ft	m	Notes	Image	Ref
Omdurman Bridge	White Nile, Sudan	1926	2,012	613	7 fixed spans, one swing span, 3,700 tons		
Desouk Bridge	Lower Nile, Egypt	1927	2,010	610	10 spans including 194 feet (59 m) swing span, 3,800 tons		
Tyne Bridge	Newcastle, England	1928	1,254	382	Approximately 8,000 tons, (Road)		
Alfred Beit Bridge	South Africa	1929	1,515	462	1,876 tons		
Sydney Harbour Bridge	Sydney, Australia	1932	3,770	1,150	Total weight of fabricated steelwork 51,000, weight of steel in the arch 38,000 tons		
Grafton Bridge	Grafton, NSW, Australia	1932	1,309	399	It is a dual level road and rail Bascule Bridge, the upper deck carrying a roadway and the lower level carrying the rail line and foot bridge.		
Lambeth Bridge	London, England	1932	776	237	5 spans, 4,620 tons, (Road)		
Memorial Bridge, Bangkok	Thailand	1932	755	230	1,100 tons, (Road)		
Khedive Ismail Bridge	Cairo, Egypt	1933	1,250	380	3,000 tons		
Newport bridge	Middlesbrough	1934	270	82	The central lifting span 66 feet (20 m) wide, weighing 5,400 long tons (5,500 t); the towers are 182 feet (55 m) high. The total weight is 8,000 tons.		
Birchenough Bridge	Zimbabwe	1935	1,241	378	1,242 tons.		
Storstrøm Bridge	Denmark	1937	10,535	3,211	21,000 tons, (Railway and Road)		
Chien Tang River Bridge	China	1937	3,480	1,060	16 equal spans, 4,135 tons, (Railway and Road)		
Adomi Bridge (originally Volta Bridge)	Atimpoku, Ghana	1957	1,096	334	arch bridge with roadway suspended from arch		
Silver Jubilee Bridge	Runcorn and Widnes, England	1961	1,582	482	Road		

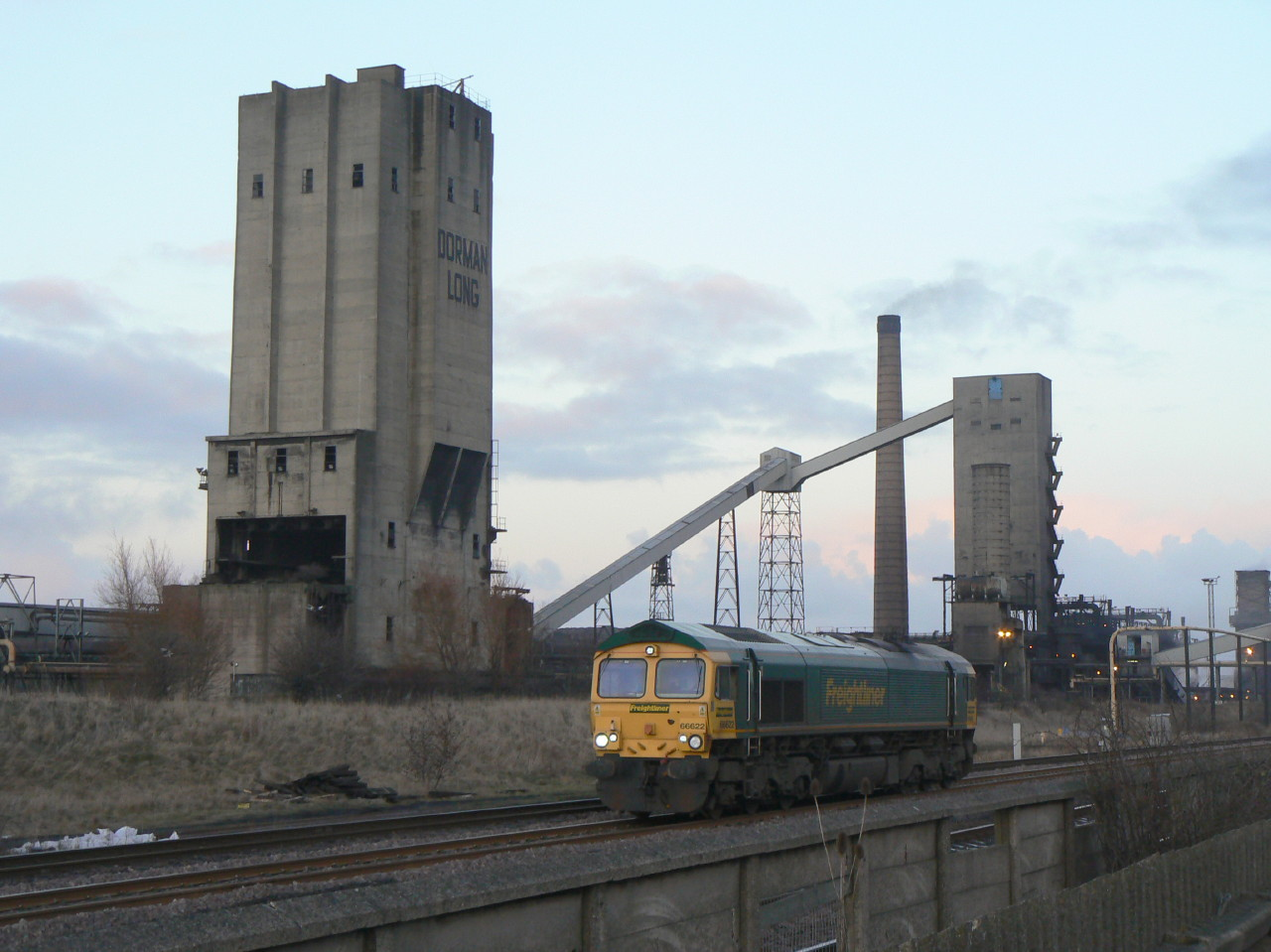
Dorman Long coal and water tower

== Dorman Museum ==
In 1904 Sir Arthur Dorman of Dorman Long gave the Dorman Museum to Middlesbrough in honour of his youngest son, George Lockwood Dorman, an avid collector who died in the Boer War. Amongst the museum's exhibits is a collection of ceramics from the local Linthorpe Pottery, which was known for its iridescent glazes which, at the time, were not produced anywhere else in Europe.

== Dorman Long Tower ==
The Dorman Long tower was built from 1955 to 1956 as a coking plant for steel production. The tower was an early example of brutalist architecture. It was scheduled to be demolished in 2021 due its poor state of repair and granted Grade II listed status, in an emergency listing by Historic England on 10 September 2021. The emergency listing cited its significance as a "recognised and celebrated example of early Brutalist architecture", a "nationally unique surviving structure from the twentieth-century coal, iron and steel industries" as well as "for its association with, and an advert for, Dorman Long which dominated the steel and heavy engineering industry of Teesside".

In one of her first acts as Culture Secretary, Nadine Dorries revoked the listing – amidst accusations of "cultural vandalism" – enabling demolition of the building to be scheduled. The tower was demolished between 00:00 and 00:20 on 19 September 2021 in a series of controlled explosions.

== See also ==
- List of Brutalist structures
