= Omdurman Bridge =

Bridge between Khartoum and Omdurman, Sudan

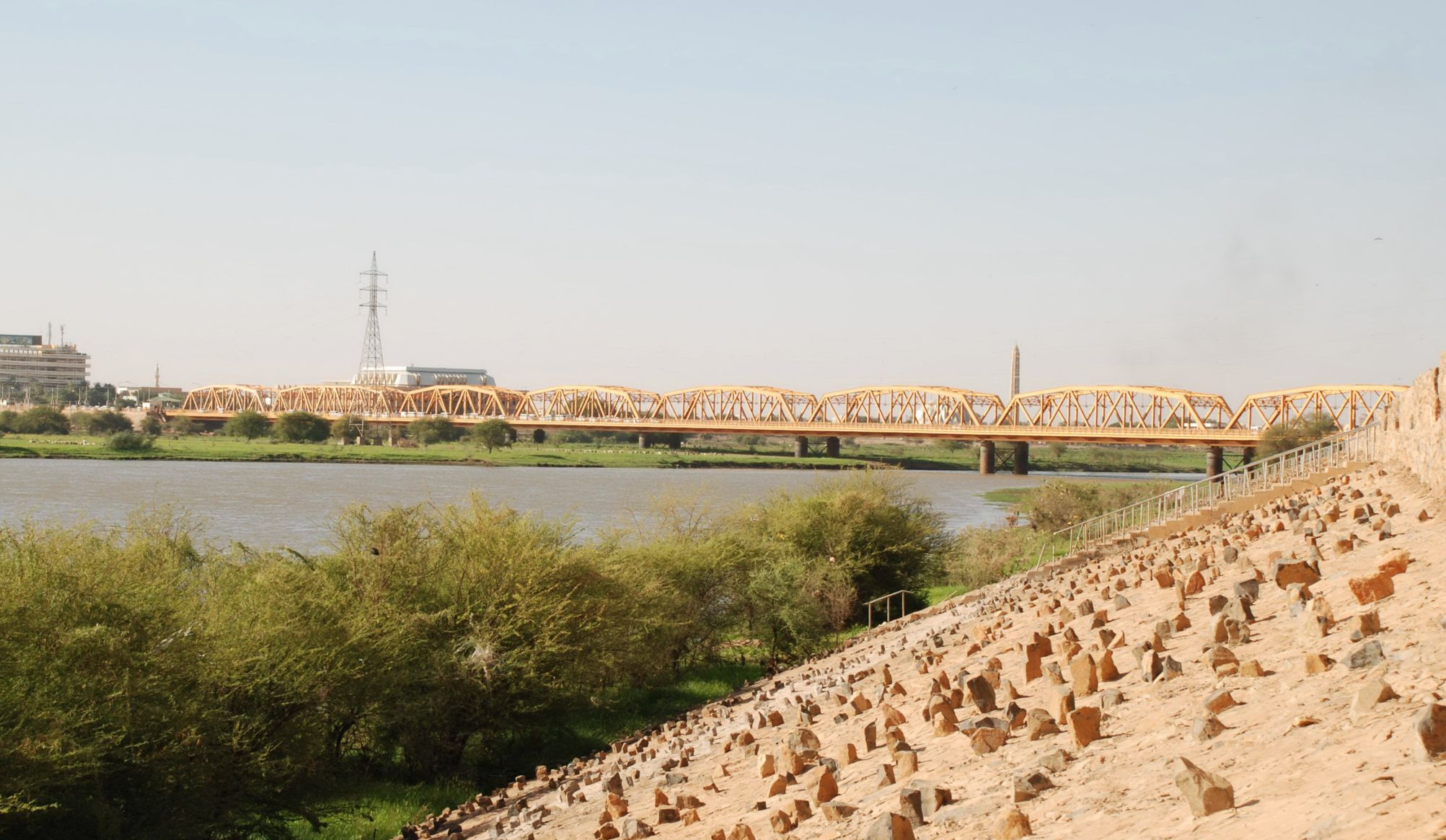
- Coordinates: 15°36′50.64″N 32°29′25.99″E
- Carries: Road
- Crosses: White Nile
- Locale: Omdurman
- Official name: White Nile Bridge

Characteristics
- Design: Truss bridge
- Total length: 613 metres

History
- Constructed by: Dorman Long
- Construction start: 1924
- Construction end: 1926
- Opened: 1926

Location
- Interactive map of Omdurman Bridge

The Omdurman Bridge (also known as the Redemption Bridge or the Old White Nile Bridge) is a steel truss bridge in Sudan on the road connecting Khartoum on the White Nile to Omdurman.

== History ==
The bridge was built between 1924 and 1926 by Dorman Long from Teesside, England: it is 613 metres long and is supported by seven pairs of round pillars.
