= Bolckow, Vaughan =

English ironmaking and mining company

- Bolckow, Vaughan blastfurnacemen and blast furnace, Middlesbrough
- Industry: Iron and Steel
- Founded: 1840 (partnership); 1864 (company)
- Founder: Henry Bolckow, John Vaughan
- Defunct: 1929
- Fate: Acquired by Dorman Long, liquidated
- Headquarters: Middlesbrough, UK

Bolckow, Vaughan & Co., Ltd was an English ironmaking and mining company founded in 1864, based on the partnership since 1840 of its two founders, Henry Bolckow and John Vaughan. The firm drove the dramatic growth of Middlesbrough and the production of coal and iron in the north-east of England in the 19th century. The two founding partners had an exceptionally close working relationship which lasted until Vaughan's death.

By 1907, Bolckow and Vaughan was possibly the largest producer of pig iron in the world. The firm failed to modernise at the start of the 20th century, and was closed in 1929.

== History ==
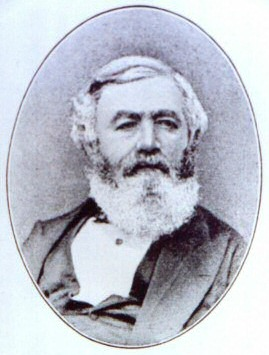
Henry Bolckow (1806–1878), founder and financier

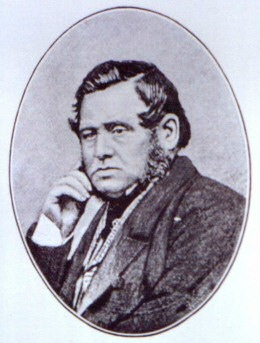
John Vaughan (1799–1868), founder and ironmaster

=== Origins, 1840–51 ===
In 1840, Henry Bolckow (1806–1878) and John Vaughan (1799–1868) set up in business in Middlesbrough to make iron. They lived side by side in two town houses, the Cleveland Buildings, about 400 yards (370 m) away from their ironworks which were on Vulcan Street, and they married a pair of sisters, which may explain their close friendship.

In 1846, Bolckow and Vaughan built their first blast furnaces at Witton Park, founding the Witton Park Ironworks. The works used coal from Witton Park Colliery to make coke, and ironstone from Whitby on the coast. The pig iron produced at Witton was transported to Middlesbrough for further forging or casting.

In 1850, Vaughan and his mining geologist John Marley discovered iron ore, conveniently situated near Eston in the Cleveland Hills of Yorkshire. Unknown to anyone at the time, this vein was part of the Cleveland Ironstone Formation, which was already being mined in Grosmont by Losh, Wilson and Bell.

=== The boom years, 1851–1868 ===
To make use of the ore being mined at Eston, Bolckow and Vaughan built a blast furnace in 1851 at nearby South Bank, Middlesbrough, enabling the entire process from rock to finished products to be carried out in one place. It was the first to be built on Teesside, on what was later nicknamed "the Steel River". Middlesbrough grew from 40 inhabitants in 1829 to 7600 in 1851, 19,000 in 1861 and 40,000 in 1871, fuelled by the iron industry.

In 1864, Bolckow, Vaughan and Company Ltd was registered with capital of £2,500,000, making it the largest company ever formed up to that time. By that time, the company's assets included iron mines, collieries, and limestone quarries in Cleveland, County Durham and Weardale respectively, and had iron and steel works extending over 700 acres (280 ha) along the banks of the River Tees.

In 1868, Vaughan died. The Institution of Civil Engineers, in their obituary, commented on the relationship between Vaughan and Bolckow: "There was indeed something remarkable in the thorough division of labour in the management of the affairs of the firm. While possessing the most unbounded confidence in each other, the two partners never interfered in the slightest degree with each other's work. Mr. Bolckow had the entire management of the financial department, while Mr. Vaughan as worthily controlled the practical work of the establishment."

=== Industrial giant, 1869–1929 ===
In 1871, Edward Johnson-Ferguson (1849–1929) became a director of Bolckow & Vaughan; he became chairman and managing director (and was knighted) in 1906, remaining so until his death.

In 1875, Edward Windsor Richards became the General Manager of the Middlesbrough Ironworks. Richards was in charge of the design and construction of the new plant at Eston, the Cleveland Steel Works. It had three coke fired haematite blast furnaces. Richards' work helped to improve the Bessemer process for making steel, in the case when the ore is rich in phosphorus, and an alkaline rock (dolomite, limestone or magnesite) is used. This variant is called the Gilchrist-Thomas process, after its inventor Sidney Gilchrist Thomas who persuaded Richards to adopt it.

In 1877, the Eston Ironworks acquired a rolling mill engine from the Vulcan Iron Works of Thwaites and Carbutt, Bradford. It had a 36-inch (910 mm) bore, and a 54-inch (1,400 mm) stroke.

A profitable sideline to the production of iron was salt. In 1863, John Marley discovered a deposit of rock salt at Middlesbrough while drilling for water. The salt bed was 100 feet (30 metres) thick at a depth of 1,300 feet (400 metres) below the surface, but it proved too costly to mine conventionally because of continual flooding, and mining was abandoned. However, in 1882 the technique of hydraulic extraction of salt was introduced. Salt was brought to the surface by pumping fresh water down a borehole, allowing the salt to dissolve, and pumping the brine back up. Production by Bolckow, Vaughan and other companies reached 300,000 tons per year in the 1890s.

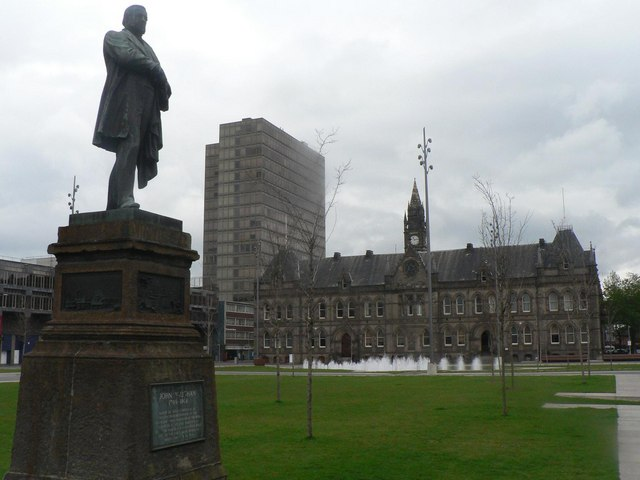
1884 monument to John Vaughan by George Anderson Lawson in Middlesbrough.

On 2 June 1884, Sir Joseph Pease unveiled a monument to John Vaughan in Exchange Square, Middlesbrough, which still stands. He gave a speech to the crowd of 15,000 people, in which he described the town as "the greatest iron-producing district in the world", and compared Bolckow and Vaughan to the mythical founding fathers of Rome, Romulus and Remus. The bronze statue was sculpted by George Anderson Lawson of the New Sculpture movement.

Bulmer's Gazetteer of 1890 records that in 1888 Bolckow, Vaughan owned 6 of the 36 ironstone mines in Cleveland and Whitby; the ironstone in their mine at Eston contained 33.62% Iron. By 1887 the company owned 4 of the 21 ironworks in Cleveland, with 21 of the 91 blast furnaces.

Punching and straightening hot fishplates, Cleveland Works, 1920s

In the 1900s, Bolckow, Vaughan was certainly the largest steel producer in Britain, and possibly the largest in the world. In 1905, the firm produced 820,000 tons of pig iron, which was 8.5% of Great Britain's output, and twice as much as the next largest producer. In 1907 it was one of the largest firms in Britain, with 20,000 employees.

In 1918, the firm even had its own women's football team. Bolckow, Vaughan's women workers were runners-up in a replayed final tie for the Tyne Wear & Tees Alfred Wood Munition Girls Cup. They were defeated 5–0 by Blyth Spartans.

=== Collapse ===
Fresh management was brought into Bolckow Vaughan in the later 1920s, Holberry Mensforth as managing director working with Henry Duncan McLaren. The works were reorganised, and consultation with the workforce introduced. Financial pressures saw it undergo a merger with Dorman Long, in 1931. The causes of failure included: poor decision-making in the period from 1900 to 1910 which delayed the introduction of improved steelmaking technology; optimistic belief in promises of funding made by the British government during the war, leading to reliance on costly bank loans in 1918, rather than issuing share capital as the firm later did in 1919 and 1923; failure to diversify into profitable steel products such as pipes, sheet steel and shipbuilding plates; and failure to invest in its own coal mines to provide enough for steel production, and for cash. There were thus both long-term and short-term failures of strategy. No company history was written.

The rise and fall of the company can be seen in the numbers of mines and collieries that it owned:

Mines and Collieries Owned by Bolckow, Vaughan
No. of Workers (not including Ironworks)					11,533	11,846		14,612	12,463	8,800	7,999	0
No. of Mines and Collieries	10	16	17	20	19	22	15	23	26	23	23	0
Date	1864	1873	1882	1888	1896	1902	1909	1914	1921	1923	1925	1929

Bolckow, Vaughan & Co Ltd, Middlesbrough, Steelworks department, 1929

The production of pig-iron, which was once profitable, but later became a weakness when rivals were producing steel, shows growth and slow decline:

Production of Pig-Iron by Bolckow, Vaughan
tons	20,000	460,000	640,000	820,000	740,000
% of GB total		6.2%	7.4%	8.5%	7.2%
Date	1845	1885	1896	1905	1913

== Legacy ==
Few visible signs of the company remain. The former extent of the Bolckow, Vaughan property at the Eston Sheet and Galvanizing Works beside the River Tees Dockyard is still marked by boundary stones on Smiths Dock Road, Middlesbrough. The graves of the founding fathers of the company and of Middlesbrough, Henry Bolckow and John Vaughan, in St Cuthbert's Churchyard, Marton, fell into disrepair. They were refurbished in 2009.

== Sources ==
- Abé, E. (1996), "The Technological Strategy of a Leading Iron and Steel Firm, Bolckow Vaughan & Co. Ltd: Late Victorian Industrialists Did Fail", Business History, 38: 45–76, doi:10.1080/00076799600000003
- Birch, Alan (2005) [1967], "XV. The New Factors of Industrial Location: Ores for Steel", Economic History of the British Iron and Steel Industry, Routledge, pp. 331–333, ISBN 0-415-38248-3
- Fletcher, Joseph Smith (1918), The Making of Modern Yorkshire, 1750–1914, George Allen & Unwin
- Institution of Civil Engineers (1869), "Obituary. John Vaughan, 1799–1868", Minutes of the Proceedings, 28 (1869): 622, doi:10.1680/imotp.1869.23113
- Jeans, James Stephen (1875), Pioneers of the Cleveland Iron Trade, H. C. Reid
- Pitts, Marianne (April 2007), "How are the mighty fallen: Bolckow Vaughan Co. Ltd. 1864–1929" (PDF), edwards.usask.ca, archived from the original (PDF) on 27 September 2013
- Tolliday, S. (1987), Business, Banking and Politics: The Case of British Steel, 1918–1939, Harvard University Press, ISBN 0-674-08725-9
