= Cleveland Ironstone Formation =

Geological formation in England

- Stratigraphic range: Pliensbachian
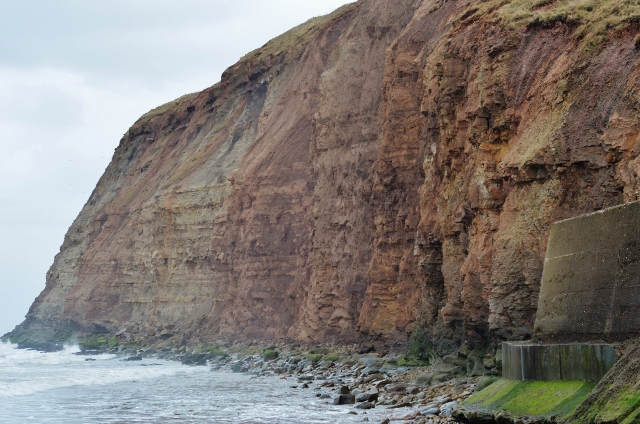
- Exposure of the Cleveland Ironstone Formation near Skinningrove
- Type: Geological formation
- Unit of: Lias Group
- Underlies: Whitby Mudstone Formation
- Overlies: Staithes Sandstone Formation
- Thickness: up to 25 metres (80 ft)

Lithology
- Primary: Mudstone, Siltstone, Ironstone
- Other: Sandstone

Location
- Region: Europe
- Country: United Kingdom
- Extent: Cleveland Basin

Type section
- Named for: Cleveland, England
- Location: cliffs near Staithes

Image of Staithes showing part of the village (foreground), the east-side harbour wall (middle left) and the headland of Penny Nab (centre background). The base of the Cleveland Ironstone commences at the foot of the cliff.

The Cleveland Ironstone Formation is a sequence of marine ironstone seams interbedded with shale and siltstone units which collectively form a part of the Lower Jurassic System of rocks underlying Cleveland in North Yorkshire. Exploitation of the ironstone seams became a major driving force behind the industrialisation of the Teesside district during the mid- to late-1800s.

Based on the stratigraphy of the formation, the Cleveland Ironstone was found to belong within the Upper Pliensbachian (Domerian) universal stage. Ironstone seams and accompanying shales may be highly fossiliferous with remains so abundant in parts as to form well-developed shell-beds. Analysis reveals a wealth of shallow-water marine species, some in life position, along with trace fossils including Rhizocorallium burrows well exposed at Old Nab, east of Staithes.

== Stratigraphy ==
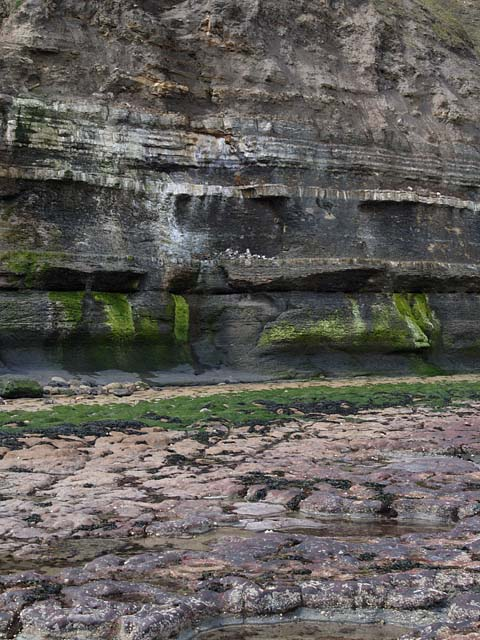
Seams of the Cleveland Ironstone formation well exposed on the coast at Jet Wyke. The Avicula seam forms the rock platform. Above it come the Raisdale, Two Foot, Pecten (5 thin bands) and Main seams

Formerly classified as part of the Middle Lias, these strata were deposited over a period of about 2 million years, as soft sediment on the floor of a shallow arm of the ancient Tethys Ocean, between c.185 million and 183 million years before present. The formation lies conformably on the prolifically-fossiliferous shallow marine sandstone, siltstone and mudrock of the Staithes Formation. There are six named ironstone seams which are, in order of deposition, the Osmotherley, Avicula, Raisdale, Two-foot, Pecten and Main Seams.

At its type locality, on the coast around Staithes, North Yorkshire, the formation attains a thickness of 25.3 metres and comprises five 'coarsening-upward' cycles of marine shale and siltstone each capped by a seam of ironstone of varying thickness, composition and iron-content. The shales and siltstones are grey in colour, and exhibit occasional bands of calcareous or sideritic nodules, shell-beds and cross-bedding. The uppermost reaches of some of the shale units may be laminated and have been dubbed tempestites. Immediately beneath the Raisdale Seam at Staithes can be seen laminated beds with basal gutters up to 1 foot 8 inches (0.5 m) wide and 16 feet (5 m) long which were scoured out during high energy storm events. The gutters have been subsequently infilled with fine sand and silt which shows signs of pyritisation. These features tend to be oriented in an east-west direction and are fairly persistent laterally, occurring almost 12 miles (19 km) to the south-east at Hawsker Bottoms.

Definitive zonal work has been carried out on the coast by Howarth (1953), Howard (1985) and extended inland by Chowns (1968). Their efforts reveal that these strata span two faunal zones prompting subdivision into corresponding informal units. The lowest 62 feet (19 m) are predominantly shaley and include the Osmotherly, Avicula, Raisdale and Two-foot Seams, the best-developed being the Avicula Seam attaining c.0.5 metre at Jet Wyke. They reside within the upper part of the Amaltheus margaritatus faunal zone and are collectively referred to as the Penny Nab Member, after a headland c.150 metres east of Staithes Harbour.

An unconformity marks transition to the overlying Pleuroceras spinatum zone which covers the more ferruginous upper 6 metres of the formation. It is referred to as the Kettleness Member, and includes the Pecten and Main Seams, the latter c.1.8 metres thick and split into a 0.7 metre Top Block and 0.8 metre Bottom Block by 0.3 metre of medial shale at Old Nab.

The most important seams, from an economic perspective, are the Main and Pecten Seams which attain their greatest development along the northern edge of the ore-field, near Eston. There the Main Seam, 3.66 metres thick, rests directly on the Pecten Seam (1.23 metres) which includes an impressive shell-bed. The seams are relatively persistent in an east-west direction, but shale-partings intervene and thicken to the south at the expense of the ironstone. In East Cleveland the strata pass through a structural syncline known as the Skelton Syncline where the Main Seam descends to around 410 feet (125 m) below sea level around North Skelton.

The whole formation thins and becomes less-ferruginous to the south as the Main Seam, itself much diminished, oversteps each of the underlying seams one-by-one. Strata of this age are completely absent at the southerly limit of the Yorkshire Basin around Market Weighton.

== Lithology ==
On average the Cleveland Ironstone Formation comprises around 70% shale and 30% ironstone though the latter occurs in the form of the six named seams of variable thickness. The ironstone is classed as being low-grade with an iron-content of up to 33%, and is deemed economically viable only above ~27%.

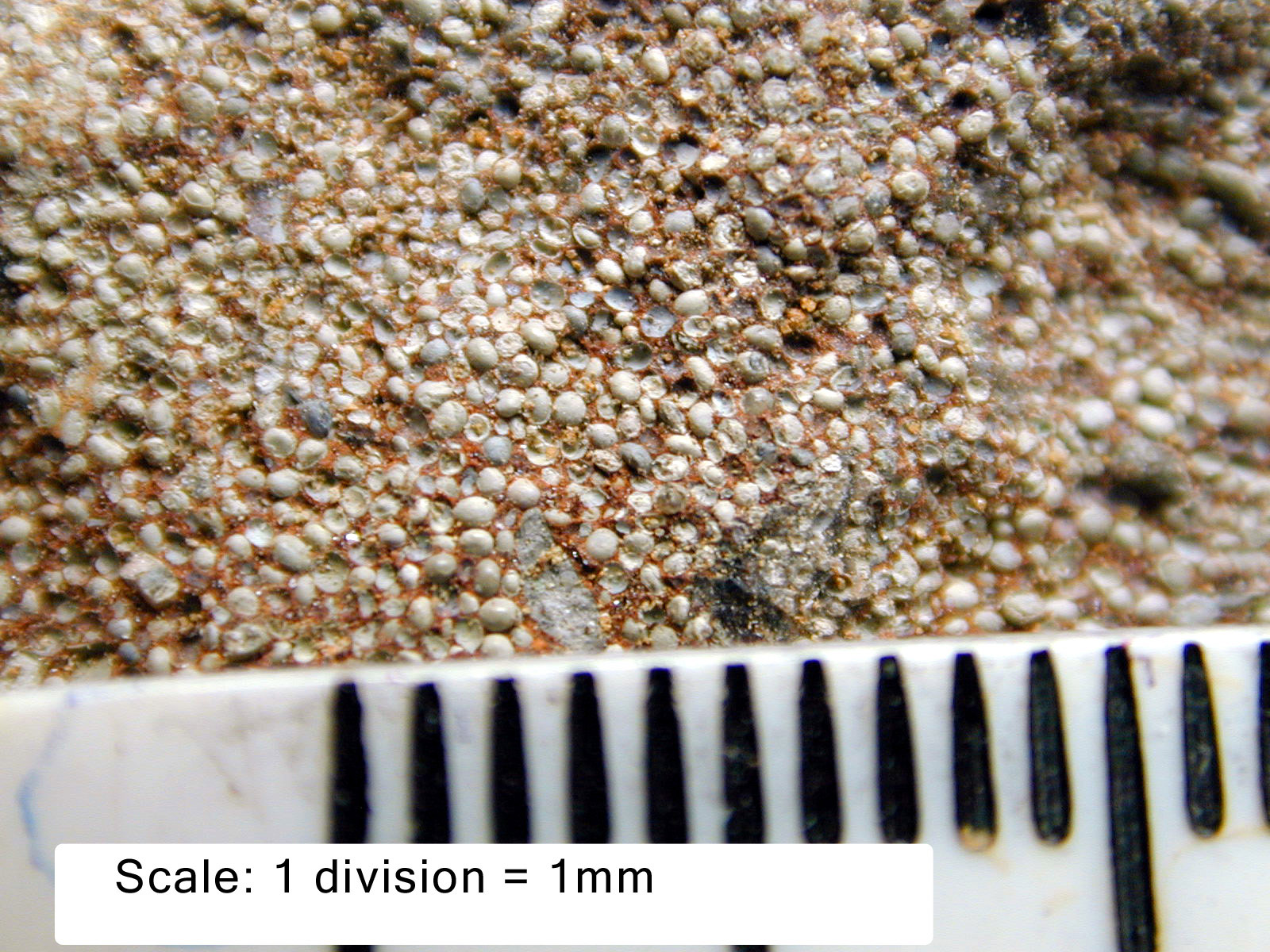
Close-up of a sample of Cleveland ironstone from Kilton Mine demonstrating the rock's oolitic texture.

The primary iron-bearing minerals are the iron carbonate siderite (FeCO_{3}) and berthierine (formerly known as chamosite,(Fe^{2+}_{2}Al(Si,Al)O_{5}(OH)_{4}). Ancillary components include calcite (as MgCO_{3} and MnCO_{3}), pyrite (FeS_{2}), collophanite (Ca_{3}P_{2}O_{8} H_{2}O ), silica (Si), clay minerals and derivatives such as octahedrite (brookite) (TiO_{2}), and dickite (Al_{2}Si_{2}O_{5}(OH)_{4}). The seams are often oolitic, especially in the north of the district, but vary in constitution across the ore-field. The ooids (on average) comprise ~33% siderite, ~33% berthierine, and a similar proportion of ancillary minerals and demonstrate deformation whilst the sediment was still plastic.

The origins of the ironstone seams have been the subject of much argument and counter-argument since their large scale exploitation commenced in the mid-1800s. The most widely accepted explanation emerged in the 1920s following analysis by Hallimond (1925). This suggests that the concentration of dissolved iron within the surrounding sea-water remained approximately the same during deposition of both shale and ironstone. The physical differences between the two arises as the result of variations in sediment influx. Rapid rates of sediment input caused deposition of the shales, whereas a diminished rate of input enabled the same amount of iron to be concentrated within a lower sediment load thereby producing the ironstone seams. Evidence of bivalves in life position, Rhizocorallium trace fossils, cross-bedding, episodes of non-deposition and (not least) the oolitic texture all indicate that the ironstones were laid down in shallow water.

Fossils are ubiquitous, especially within the ironstone seams, to the extent that the Avicula and Pecten seams are named after their most abundant faunal inclusions.

NOTE: The only surviving extensive outcrop of the Main Seam occurs in woodland north of Skelton (close to NZ 6554 1997) at around 50m O.D above Skelton Beck achieving a thickness of around 2.4m (8 feet). It is underlain by the Black Hard, and three beds making up the Pecten Seam.

== Economic history ==
Economically, the Cleveland Ironstone proved to be a crucial catalyst with the power to reinvigorate the flagging commercial fortunes of the River Tees and surrounding district. The occurrence of ironstone in Cleveland has been known about for many centuries with evidence of small scale working predating the occupation of Roman Britain. Despite much early attention, the true extent of the Cleveland ore-field remained a mystery until the late-1840s, when ironmaster John Vaughan (1799–1868) and mining engineer John Marley (1823–1891), both of the Bolckow Vaughan company, traced seams of ironstone along the coast between Staithes and their northerly outcrop on the escarpment of the Eston Hills overlooking the River Tees.

Vaughan and Marley's evidence of a large scale body of workable iron ore in close proximity to both coal and limestone from County Durham, together with the district's developing communications network by rail and sea, proved a heady concoction. Combine with this an insatiable appetite for manufactured goods driven by the Industrial Revolution and a cohort of shrewd opportunist business speculators, and it may come as no surprise that Middlesbrough developed rapidly, led by Bolckow Vaughan, which mined and refined iron, and manufactured goods from it. The town grew from a mere idea in the late-1820s, to become the commercial centre of one of the world's greatest iron and steel producing regions in little over two generations. By 1881, the year of Middlesbrough's Golden Jubilee, output of ironstone drawn from the Cleveland ore-field exceeded 6,000,000 tons (6,096,360 tonnes).

== See also ==
- Ironstone mining in Cleveland and North Yorkshire
