= Thomas William Marley =

British businessman

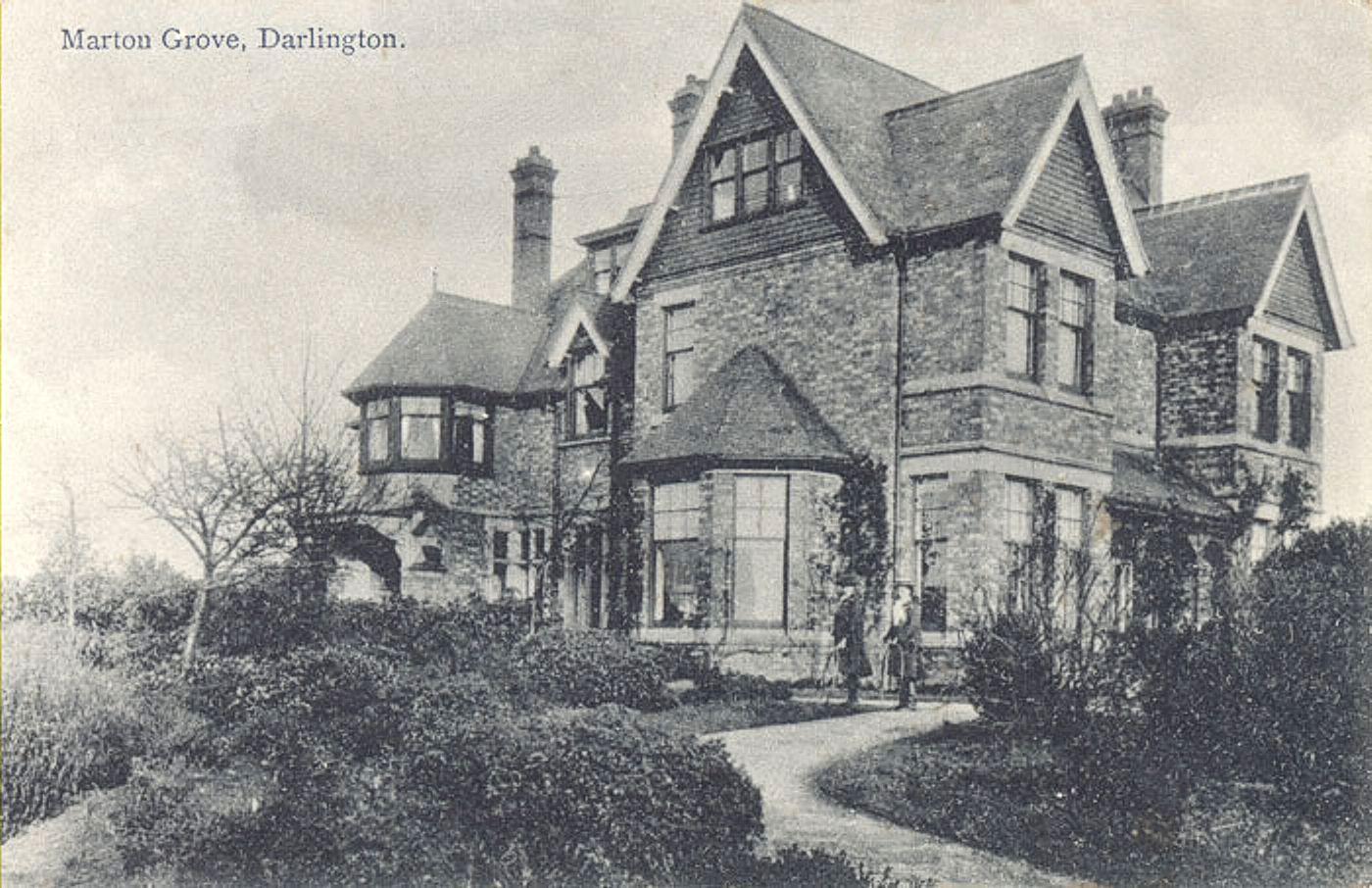
Marton Grove, Abbey Rd, Darlington (1906) Thomas William Marley and his wife Alice moved into this house in 1903 or 1904

Thomas William Marley (13 May 1850 – 14 July 1923), chairman and managing director of the North Brancepeth Coal Co. Ltd., a noted amateur genealogist, and author of a 1919 monograph "The question of the Nationalisation of the Mines". Thomas was the second son of a family of 2 boys and 6 girls of Thomas Marley and Jane Margaret Rayne. He was the nephew of the mining engineer John Marley. Many of his genealogy papers and notebooks are stored by the Northumberland Archives.

== Siblings ==
- George (b. 1 April 1842)
- Sarah Mary (b. 14 June 1844)
- Frances Ann (b. 17 July 1846)
- Elizabeth Jane (b. 10 November 1848)
- Margaret Ellen (b. 6 August 1852)
- Katherine Jane (b. 12 May 1854)
- Edith Marion (b. 28 March 1856)
