= Gunnergate Hall =

Former building in Middlesbrough, England

- Interactive map of the Gunnergate Hall area

General information
- Location: Middlesbrough, North Yorkshire, England
- Completed: 1857
- Demolished: 1946
- Client: Charles Albert Leatham

Gunnergate Hall was a mansion house with grounds in the south of Middlesbrough in North Yorkshire, England.

== History ==
Gunnergate Hall was built in 1857 for Charles Albert Leatham, a wealthy Quaker banker. Albert Leatham died in 1858 and in 1860 his widow sold Gunnergate Hall to ironmaster John Vaughan who used it as his residence. John Vaughan died in 1868 and his second son Thomas Vaughan inherited the hall and lived there. Thomas Vaughan spent extensively improving the hall, however his business failed and the hall was sold in 1881 to Carl Bolckow, nephew of Henry Bolckow. Carl Bolckow sold the hall to mayor and shipbuilder Sir Raylton Dixon in 1888. Sir Raylton Dixon died in 1901 and thereafter the hall was left unoccupied, and fell into disrepair. The hall was used as an army base in both world wars but was demolished in 1946 shortly after World War II, and the land acquired by Middlesbrough Council.

== Description ==
Gunnergate Hall was located off Tollesby Lane and there is a plaque in the grounds that shows the former location of the hall. The main entrance drive was from Stokesley Road in Marton. Gunnergate Hall had three lodges but only two survive, Hunter’s Lodge on Gunnergate Lane and High Lodge on Tollesby Lane.

The hall had a banqueting hall, ballroom and billiard room and the grounds had a rockery, tennis courts, greenhouses, waterfall, lake, fountain, and boat house. A water tower in the grounds may have supplied the lake fountain or else provided water pressure for the house.

Fairy Dell Park
- Fairy Dell
- Interactive map of Fairy Dell Park
- Type: Nature Reserve and Parkland
- Location: Middlesbrough
- Coordinates: 54.526°N 1.211°W
- Operator: Middlesbrough Council with The Friends of Fairy Dell
- Status: open all year round
- Awards: Green Flag Award
- Website: Friends of Fairy Dell

== Fairy Dell Park ==
Fairy Dell is a local nature reserve, and the former gardens and grounds of Gunnergate Hall. Fairy Dell is a laid out parkland and natural wooded beck valley with an ornamental lake and flood defence lakes that is part of the Marton West Beck wildlife corridor. The site was redeveloped as a flood defence in the late 1970s by Northumbrian Water and Middlesbrough Council.

Access to the park can be gained from nearby Newham Grange Country Farm. Wildlife to be found include watervoles, herons, kingfishers, moorhens, and mallards. Numerous chainsaw sculptures have been created in the woodlands by Steve Iredale. Activities undertaken by the Friends of Fairy Dell interest group include path clearing, strimming, and planting. The park was given a Green Flag Award by the Civic Trust.

Discoveries in the area have included animal bones and a sunken path. An archaeological dig is planned for 2014 led by Tees Archaeology. A £38,000 grant has been obtained from the Community Spaces Programme of the Heritage Lottery Fund for improving footpaths and natural woodland, flower planting, extra seating and the archaeological dig.

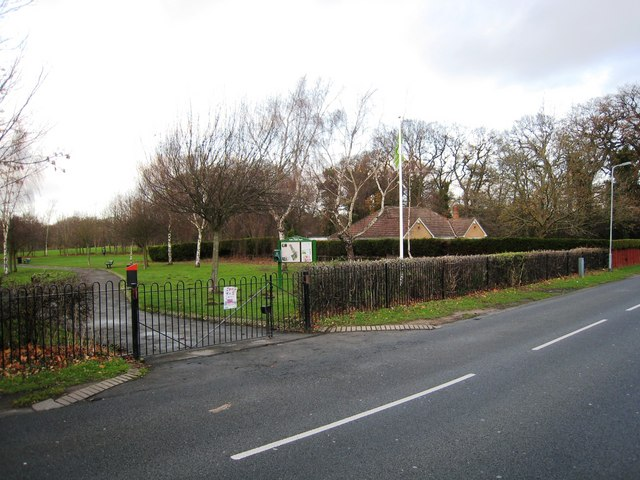
Entrance

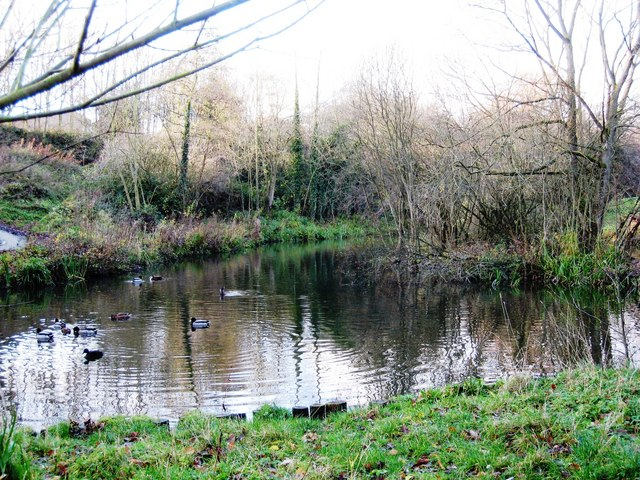
Lake

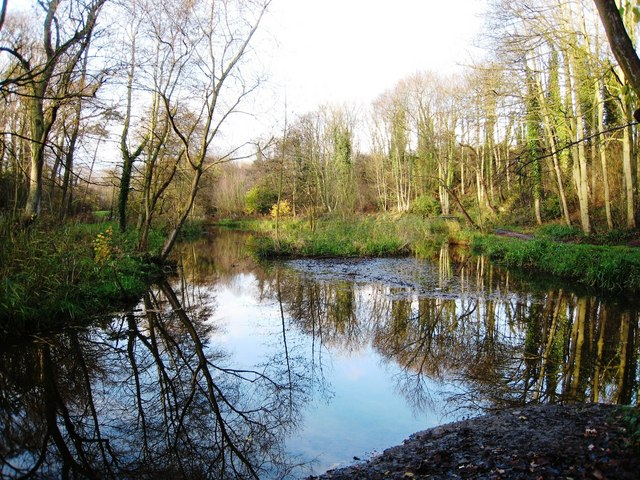

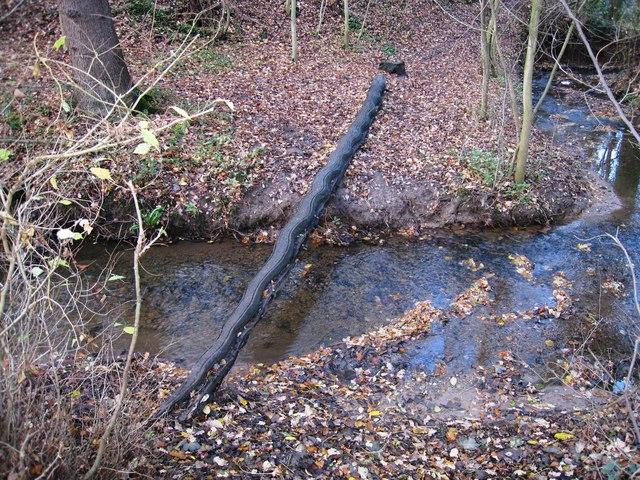
Snake sculpture

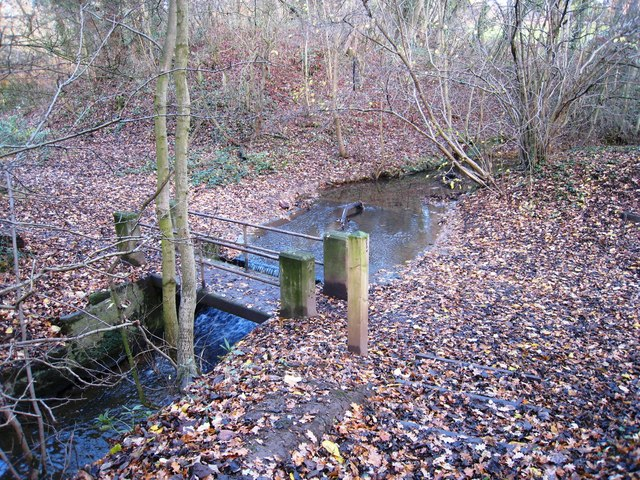
Bridge over Marton West Beck
