= Port Clarence =

Village in County Durham, England

Coordinates: 54°35′19″N 1°13′48″W

- Location within County Durham
- OS grid reference: NZ485227
- Unitary authority: Stockton-on-Tees
- Ceremonial county: County Durham
- Region: North East
- Country: England
- Sovereign state: United Kingdom
- Post town: MIDDLESBROUGH
- Postcode district: TS2
- Dialling code: 01642
- Police: Cleveland
- Fire: Cleveland
- Ambulance: North East
- UK Parliament: Stockton North

Port Clarence is a small village in the borough of Stockton-on-Tees, County Durham, England. It is on the north bank of the River Tees, and near the northern end of the Middlesbrough Transporter Bridge.

== History ==
Formerly known as Samphire Batts, it is situated on the River Tees. As the Industrial Revolution took shape and ships got bigger, access to Stockton became harder, and so colliery owners needed better access to the North Sea. It became known as Port Clarence following a visit by the then Duke of Clarence, who would later become King William IV.

=== 19th century ===
Investors created the Clarence Railway which connected Stockton to the newly developed port at Samphire Batts, and also Haverton Hill, a 0.5 miles (0.80 km) upstream. The village was hence renamed after the port. Meanwhile, its great rival the Stockton and Darlington Railway extended to Middlesbrough, on the opposite side of the river.

The S&DR extension was completed by 1830, while the CR was completed by 1833. The opening of the railways provided the stimulus for the growth of both Middlesbrough and Port Clarence. Prior to the opening of the railway, ship access to Port Clarence was very slow and difficult, often taking as long to carry the coal to the port, as it had to sail from the port to London.

However, the CR shared rail track owned by the S&DR near to the County Durham coal mines and never made a profit due to the restrictions and fees imposed by the owners of the S&DR and eventually the PCR was taken over by the Stockton and Hartlepool Railway, a subsidiary of the Hartlepool Docks and Railway Company, to allow quicker onward shipment via new docks at Hartlepool.

=== 20th century ===
The area has a strong history of immigration from Ireland, with many travellers settling in the village between 1900 and 1920 to work in the local steel and chemical industries, as well as the local Furness Shipyards.

== Present ==
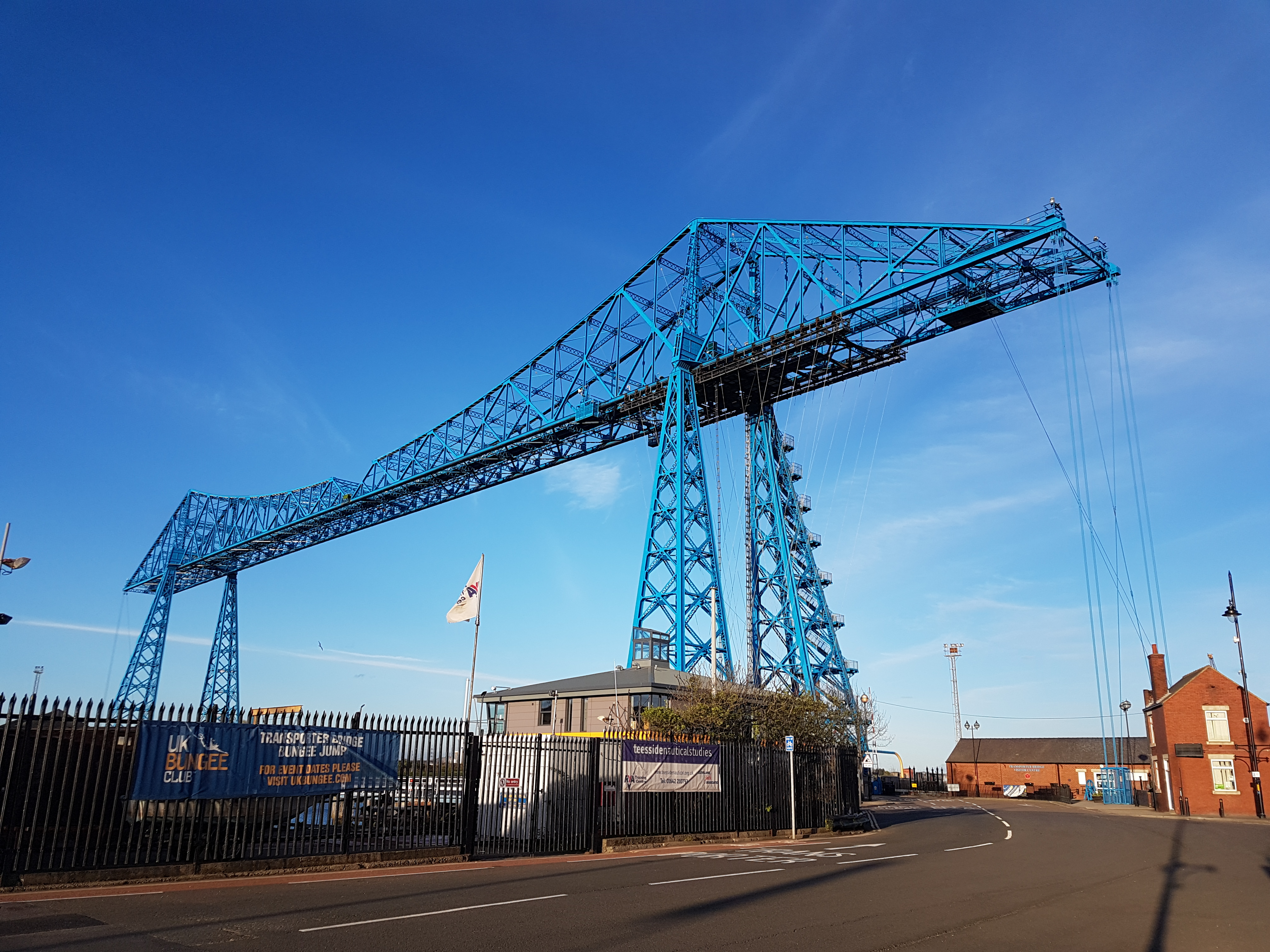
Transporter Bridge

It is served by the Stagecoach service 1 between Hartlepool and Middlesbrough. The A1046 links the village to Stockton and Middlesbrough (via the Newport Bridge) in the west and the A178 links to Hartlepool and Middlesbrough (via the Transporter Bridge) in the east.

Three hundred homes in Port Clarence were evacuated in December 2013 after the Tees burst its bank.
