= John Vaughan (ironmaster) =

British ironmaster (1799–1868)

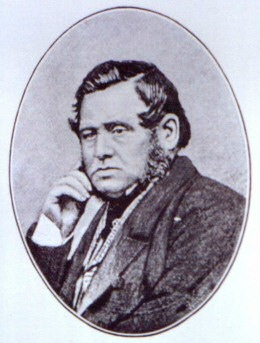
- Born: 21 December 1799; Worcester
- Died: 16 September 1868 (aged 68); London
- Occupation: Ironmaster
- Employer: Bolckow Vaughan
- Spouse(s): (1) Eleanor Downing (2) Widow Ann Mills Hughes, previously Brown, nee Poole
- Children: (1) John, Joseph, Thomas, John (2) Adopted Ann Poole's children Ann Jane, Mary Ann, William
- Parent(s): John, Mary

John Vaughan, known as Jacky, was born in Worcester on "St Thomas' Day" in 1799, the son of Welsh parents. He worked his way up the iron industry, becoming an ironmaster and co-founder of the largest of all the Victorian iron and steel companies, Bolckow Vaughan. Where Henry Bolckow provided the investment and business expertise, Vaughan contributed technical knowledge, in a long-lasting and successful partnership that transformed Middlesbrough from a small town to the centre of ironmaking in Britain.

Vaughan is best known for his discovery of ironstone in the Cleveland Hills, on an exploratory walk with his mining engineer, John Marley in June 1850.

== Early life ==
Vaughan began his working life, like his father before him, at Sir John Guest's Dowlais Ironworks in South Wales. His first job "at an early age" was in the scrap mill; from there, he became a puddler, then a furnaceman, then foreman.

After Dowlais, he worked in Staffordshire, then to Carlisle in 1825 becoming a factory manager. He then moved East to Walker-on-Tyne near Newcastle, where he became the works manager for the Losh, Wilson and Bell Ironworks. While doing business in Newcastle, he met Henry Bolckow, who at that time was a corn merchant looking to get into the iron business.

== Partnership ==
In 1839, Bolckow and Vaughan decided to form a business partnership. They looked at Stockton, on the pioneering Stockton and Darlington Railway, as it had good communications, but could not find a suitable site for an ironworks. However, the railway had run to Middlesbrough since 1833, and the partners started their ironworks there on a cheap plot of land, most of which flooded at high tide. Their iron ore consisted of iron nodules in the coal measures, or of imported hematite. As this was limiting their growth and profitability, they decided to make their own pig-iron.

In 1846 they built blast furnaces at Witton Park, County Durham for smelting iron ore; the Stockton and Darlington Railway, seeking to exploit the coal and iron trade, was conveniently extended past Witton to several of the Durham collieries; limestone could arrive from Stanhope, and coke from Crook, so the site appeared ideal. But in 1847 there was "a commercial panic" (an economic crisis), and the Witton Park Ironworks suffered both from difficult trading conditions, and from a continual shortage of iron nodules.

== Cleveland Ironstone ==
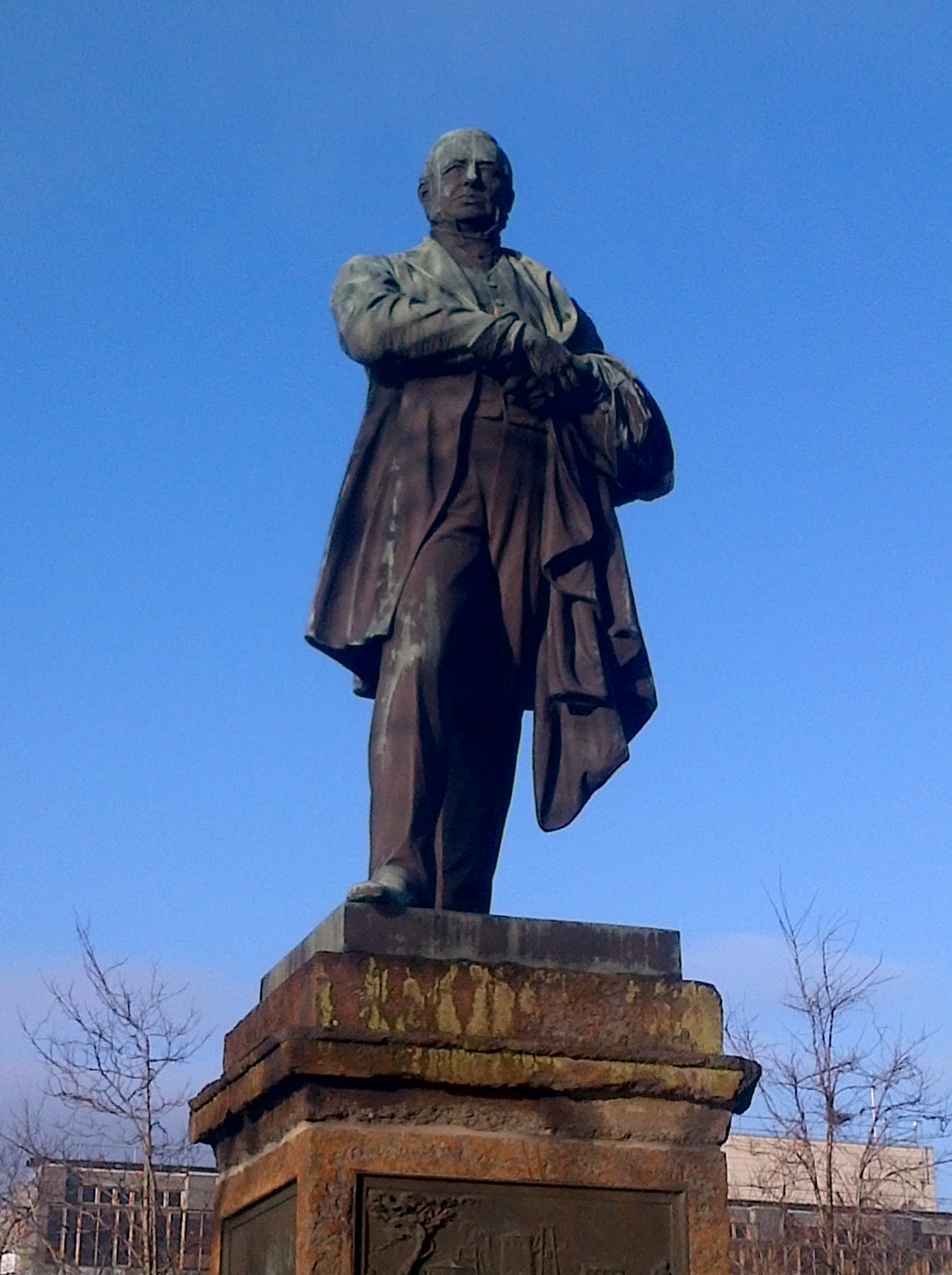
Monument to John Vaughan by George Anderson Lawson in Middlesbrough. The inscription reads: 'John Vaughan 1799–1868 Mayor of Middlesbrough 1855 discovered ironstone in the Cleveland hills founder of the iron trade in Middlesbrough. Partner of Bolckow, Vaughan & Co. who built one of the first iron works in Middlesbrough in 1840.'

Knowing of earlier attempts at extracting ironstone in Cleveland, Vaughan suspected a more abundant supply of ironstone could be found close to hand. He instructed his mining engineer, John Marley, to study Cleveland's geology.

On 8 June 1850, the two of them walked the Cleveland Hills and quickly found a plentiful source, in the shape of the main seam of Cleveland Ironstone "above sixteen feet" (about five metres) thick. Bolckow and Vaughan moved rapidly: within 12 weeks, they had signed agreements with the landowners, started the first mine, built a tramway to carry the ironstone, and delivered the first load of seven tones to Witton Park.

From that moment, their business grew swiftly. They opened more mines at Eston and added blast furnaces at Middlesbrough. The combination of Vaughan's technical skills and Bolckow's financial skills was effective and long-lasting. The partnership grew into steelmaking giant Bolckow Vaughan & Co., Ltd., formed with capital of £2,500,000 in 1864: the largest company in existence at that time.

== Wealth ==
In 1855 Vaughan became Mayor of Middlesbrough. He was a Borough Magistrate and a member of the Tees Conservancy Board.

After the death of his first wife, Vaughan married widow Ann Hughes of Newcastle, daughter of Joseph Poole and sister of Bolckow's first wife.

With increasing wealth, he and Bolckow "both moved from Cleveland Street to Marton: Bolckow built Marton Hall in 1853 and moved there in 1856, and John Vaughan moved to Gunnergate Hall in 1858."

Vaughan died in London on 16 September 1868.

== Bibliography ==
- Jeans, J. S. (1875). Pioneers of the Cleveland iron trade. Middlesbrough-on-Tee: H.G. Reid.
- Simpson, David (2009). "The Tees Valley". Middlesbrough and surrounds: Iron and Steel.
- Almond, J. K. "Vaughan, John [Jacky] (1799–1868)". Oxford Dictionary of National Biography (online ed.). Oxford University Press. doi:10.1093/ref:odnb/38091. (Subscription, Wikipedia Library access or UK public library membership required.)
- Cooper, Andy (2011). "Cleveland Ironstone Formation". Tees Valley RIGS Group.
- Simpson, David (2009). "The Birth of Middlesbrough". David Simpson.
- Wilson, Chris Scott (n.d.). "Bolckow & Vaughan". chrisscottwilson.co.uk.
- "Obituary. John Vaughan, 1799-1868". Minutes of the Proceedings of the Institution of Civil Engineers. 28 (1869): 622–627. 1869. doi:10.1680/imotp.1869.23113. ISSN 1753-7843.
- Hornby, Craig (2004). "A Century in Stone". documentary film featuring dramatisation of Vaughan and Marley's ironstone discovery. Pancrack Pictures.
