= John Marley (mining engineer) =

English mining engineer and geologist

- John Marley, discoverer of Cleveland Ironstone, c. 1880
- Born: 11 November 1823; Heighington, County Durham
- Died: 4 April 1891 (aged 67); Darlington
- Education: Denton School
- Occupation: Mining engineer
- Employer: Bolckow Vaughan
- Spouse: Sarah
- Children: Caroline, Florence, Ethel, Isabel, Hugh, J.W.
- Parent: Thomas Marley

John Marley (11 November 1823 – 4 April 1891) was an English mining engineer from Darlington who together with ironmaster John Vaughan made the "commercial discovery" of the Cleveland Ironstone Formation, the basis of the wealth of their company Bolckow Vaughan and the industrial growth of Middlesbrough. He was an effective leader of engineering operations at Bolckow Vaughan's mines and collieries. He ended his career as a wealthy independent mine-owner and president of the North of England Institute of Mining and Mechanical Engineers (NEIMME).

== Life and career ==
Marley was born at Middridge Grange, by Shildon, County Durham, England, not far from the town of Heighington. He was educated at Denton near Darlington. From 1840 he served as assistant at several Durham collieries (coal mines). In 1845 he worked as a surveyor for the Stockton and Darlington Railway.

In 1846 he became resident viewer at Woodifield Colliery, the start of his career at Bolckow & Vaughan. Over the next two decades, he became the head of engineering operations for Bolckow and Vaughan's mines and collieries, capably organising a wide range of mining operations. In 1850, Vaughan and Marley made their famous "discovery" of the main seam of Cleveland Ironstone. The existence of iron in the Cleveland Hills was in fact well known, possibly since ancient times and certainly since at least 1811, as repeated attempts had been made to sell it, but without success.

In 1852, Marley, then at Bishop Auckland, became a founding member of the North of England Institute of Mining and Mechanical Engineers (NEIMME); he joined the NEIMME council in 1856, giving his address as Mining Offices, Darlington. He became Vice-President in 1872. He served as President from 1888 to 1890.

In 1863, Marley discovered a deposit of rock salt at Middlesbrough while drilling for water. He resigned from Bolckow Vaughan in 1867, but continued to consult with them until 1869.

In 1870, Marley became chairman of his own company, the newly registered North Brancepeth Coal Co. Ltd. It grew to include 4 collieries.

== Family ==
By 1881, John Marley was living at Thornfield House, Darlington with his wife Sarah, four daughters, Caroline, Florence, Ethel and Isabel, and a son, Hugh. Another son J.W. Marley wrote a posthumous biographical note about Marley for the Institution of Mining Engineers. His nephew, Thomas William Marley followed him as chairman of the North Brancepeth Coal company.

== "Discovery" ==
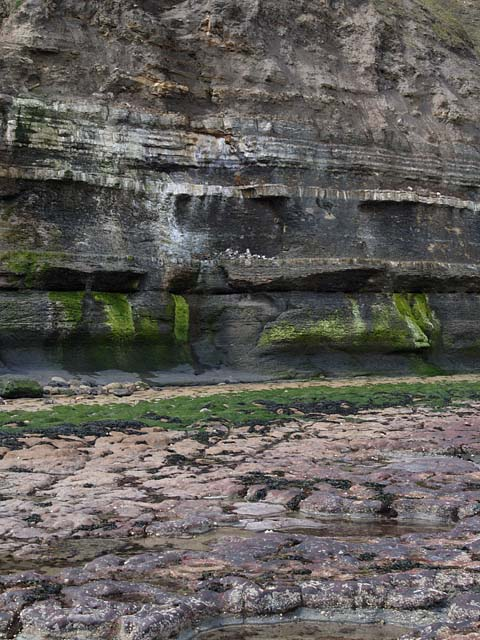
Seams of the Cleveland Ironstone Formation at Jet Wyke

=== History and geology ===
Iron has been worked in Cleveland on a small scale since before Roman times. The Cleveland Ironstone Formation consists of seams of marine ironstone alternating with shale and siltstone, of Lower Jurassic age.

The Cleveland Ironstone Formation represents the Middle Lias or Upper Pliensbachian-Domerian. Two Ammonite zones (rock layers identified by particular fossils) are (largely) included: those indexed by Pleuroceras spinatum and Amaltheus margaritatus.

=== Legend ===
The local newspaper The Northern Echo records the legend of Marley's discovery: "Legend has it that on June 8, 1850, the two men were out shooting rabbits in the Cleveland Hills. Marley tripped over a burrow. As he sprawled down the hole, his hand landed on the purest ironstone he had ever seen. "Eureka!" he shouted." The Echo at once adds "This does the men a disservice."

=== Commercial reality ===
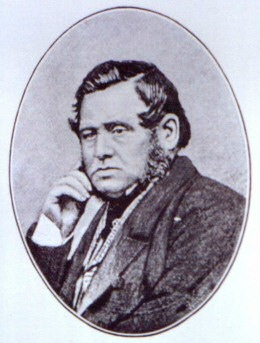
Marley's employer, John Vaughan, 1799–1868 shared the discovery of the ironstone seam.

The discovery was no serendipitous accident. Marley was asked by his employer, John Vaughan, co-founder of the company Bolckow Vaughan to study the geology of Cleveland, to help him locate a profitably thick seam of ironstone, conveniently close to Middlesbrough. Bolckow Vaughan had already in 1848 "collected and shipped to Middlesbrough several thousand tons found on the coast between Redcar and Skinningrove"; Vaughan guessed that the same thick seams including the main bed might be found inland, in the Eston and Upleatham hills near the railway.

On 8 June 1850, Marley and Vaughan walked the coast to survey it for workable iron ore, expecting to find places where they could "bore" down to find useful amounts. They discovered seams of the ironstone running from the North Yorkshire coast at Staithes inland to the Eston Hills, outcropping at the surface. This find was swiftly exploited, and Middlesbrough grew very rapidly to support the new ironworks developed by Bolckow Vaughan and others in the area. The main ironstone seam (see illustration) in the Eston Hills is 16 feet thick.

Marley is recorded as doubting "whether the Romans or the Monks [of Rievaulx] ever smelted any part of the main bed of ironstone, which has in recent years proved such a source of wealth to the North, because in the various remains of slag and refuse left by them in Bilsdale, Bransdale, Rosedale, Furnace House in Fryupdale, Rievaulx Abbey, and other places, no traces of the main seam of ironstone have been found, although 'dogger band' (or thin clay bands of ironstone) and 'nodules' have been so found along with the charcoal and slag."

Marley described his discovery as follows: "Mr. Vaughan and myself, having gone to examine the hills for the most suitable place for boring, we decided to ascend to the east, adjoining Sir J. H. Lowther's grounds, and so walk along to Lady Hewley's grounds on the west. In ascending the hill in Mr. C. Dryden's grounds, we picked up two or three small pieces of ironstone. We, therefore, continued our ascent until we came to a quarry hole, from whence this ironstone had been taken for roads, and next, on entering Sir J. H. Lowther's grounds to the west, a solid rock of ironstone was lying bare, upwards of sixteen feet thick."

The legend about the rabbit-hole did have some basis in reality: the many rabbit and fox holes provided the prospecting geologists with samples of the underlying rock (away from surface exposures of the geology at natural cliffs) at intervals along the ironstone outcrop. Marley stated "I need scarcely say that, having once found this bed, we had no difficulty in following the outcrop in going westward, without any boring, as the rabbit and fox holes therein were plentiful as we went."

The commercial benefit of the "discovery" was simple: the ironstone was exposed at the surface, "which rendered boring unnecessary." The rock could simply be quarried, and rolled in tramway wagons down to a 2-mile extension of the railway. The rate of growth of ironstone production was prodigious. In 1850, just 4,000 tons of Cleveland Ironstone were extracted. The railway extension opened on 6 January 1851, and in that year, 187,950 tons were extracted.

Blastfurnacemen of Bolckow, Vaughan

In 1857, Marley published a paper in the Transactions of the Institution of Mining Engineers on the Cleveland Ironstone, which begins: "To the members of this Institute, this ironstone cannot but be an interesting subject, whether they be mining engineers, coal owners, iron masters, or simply a part of the public personally disinterested, as I believe that nothing has been discovered, within the last twenty years, having so direct an influence on the landed, railway, and mineral wealth, in the North of England, on the South Durham coal field, and on the iron trade generally, as the discovery and application of this large ironstone district." Marley continued: "I suppose it may now be taken as an admitted fact, that the prosperity or depression of the iron and coal trades regulates, in a very material degree, the prosperity or depression of nearly all other commercial pursuits in the same locality."

Marley was correct. In 1864, just 14 years after the discovery of the rich source of ironstone, Bolckow, Vaughan and Company Ltd was registered with capital of £2,500,000, making it the largest company ever formed up to that time. Middlesbrough more than doubled in population from 7600 in 1851 to 19,000 in 1861, and then doubled again to 40,000 in 1871, driven by the iron industry.

== Sources ==
- Anon. Obituary. John Marley, 1823–1891. Minutes of the Proceedings, Institution of Civil Engineers, Vol. 105, 1891, 308–311.
- Jeans, James Stephen. Pioneers of the Cleveland Iron Trade. H.G. Reid, Middlesbrough-on-Tees. 1875.
- Marley, John. Cleveland Ironstone. Outline Of The Main Or Thick Stratified Bed, Its Discovery, Application, And Results, In Connection With The Iron-Works In The North Of England Transactions of the North of England Institute of Mining Engineers, Vol. V, 1857, 165-223.
- Marley, John. On the Discovery of Rock Salt in the New Red Sandstone at Middlesbrough. Transactions of the North of England Institute of Mining Engineers, Vol. XIII, 1863, 17-24.
- Marley, J.W. Memoir Of John Marley. By His Son, J. W. Marley. Transactions of the North of England Institute of Mining and Mechanical Engineers, Vol. 41, 1891–92, 28-30.
- Pitts, Marianne (April 2007). "How are the mighty fallen: Bolckow Vaughan Co. Ltd. 1864–1929" (PDF). edwards.usask.ca. Archived from the original (PDF) on 27 September 2013.
