= Stert (disambiguation) =

Stert is a village in Wiltshire, England.

Stert may also refer to

- Stert, a village in Somerset, England, now generally called Steart
- Stert Island, in the Bristol Channel, England
- Johannes Stert (b,1963), German composer

== See also ==
- Sterte
