= Bridgwater Bay =

Bay in Bristol Channel

- Site of Special Scientific Interest
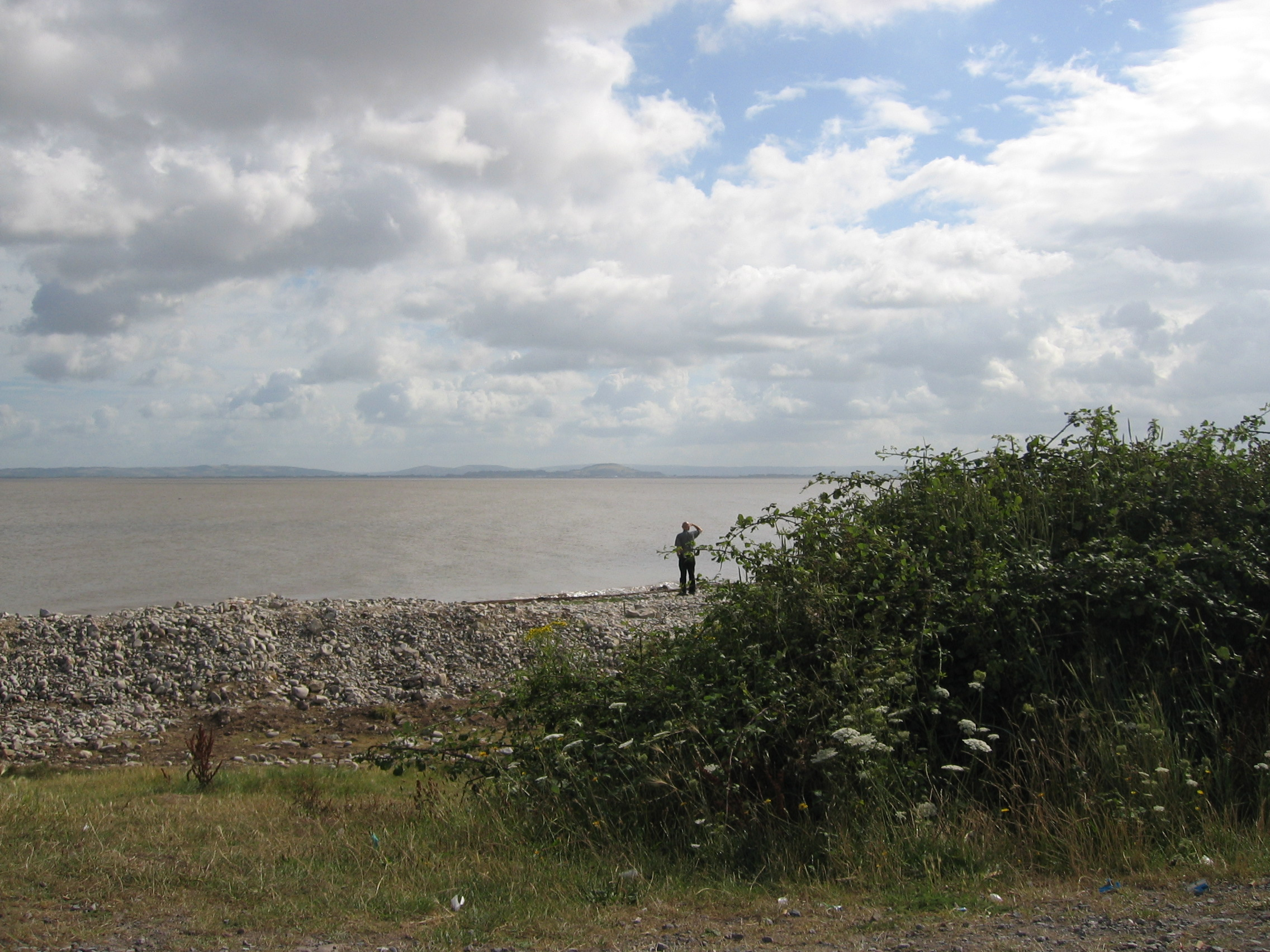
- Bridgwater Bay near the mouth of the River Parrett

- Location within Somerset
- Location of Bridgwater Bay.
- Area of search: Somerset
- Grid reference: ST290480
- Coordinates: 51.25°N 3.20°W
- Interest: Biological
- Area: 3,574.1 ha (35.741 km^{2}; 13.800 sq mi)
- Notification date: 1989

Bridgwater Bay is on the Bristol Channel, 5 kilometres (3.1 mi) north of Bridgwater in Somerset, England at the mouth of the River Parrett and the end of the River Parrett Trail. It stretches from Minehead at the southwestern end of the bay to Brean Down in the north. The area consists of large areas of mudflats, saltmarsh, sandflats and shingle ridges, some of which are vegetated. It has been designated as a Site of Special Scientific Interest (SSSI) covering an area of 3,574.1 hectares (35.741 km^{2}; 13.800 sq mi) since 1989, and is designated as a wetland of international importance under the Ramsar Convention. The risks to wildlife are highlighted in the local Oil Spill Contingency Plan.

Several rivers, including the Parrett, Brue and Washford, drain into the bay. Man-made drainage ditches from the Somerset Levels, including the River Huntspill, also run into the bay. The mud flats provide a habitat for a wide range of flora and fauna. These include some nationally rare plants, beetles and snails. It is particularly important for overwintering waders and wildfowl, with approximately 190 species recorded including Eurasian whimbrel (Numenius phaeopus), black-tailed godwit (Limosa limosa), dunlin (Calidris alpina) and wigeon (Anas penelope). Fishing has taken place using shallow boats, known as flatners, and fixed wooden structures for hundreds of years. It was also the last site in England used for 'mudhorse fishing'. There are several small harbours along the coast.

The low-lying areas of the bay have been subject to flooding, including the Bristol Channel floods of 1607 and many times since particularly around the Steart Peninsula. In response to this threat sea walls have been built at several points including at Burnham-on-Sea, Berrow and Blue Anchor to Lilstock Coast. The extensive mud flats and high tidal range have been the cause of several drownings and rescue services are now provided by the Burnham Area Rescue Boat.

== Geography ==
Mud danger signs on Bridgwater Bay near the mouth of the River Parrett are necessary because fast, high-amplitude tides here have led to drownings on the extensive mud flats.

Bridgwater Bay forms a portion of the coastline of Somerset on the southern side of the Bristol Channel stretching from the Quantock Hills at the south western end to Brean Down at the northern end. Around the coastline is a wave-cut platform of Jurassic Blue Lias. Several rivers flow into the bay, the main ones being the Parrett, Brue and Washford, along with the man-made River Huntspill. Major features and settlements along the coastline, running from north east to south west, include: Brean, Berrow, Burnham on Sea, the mouth of the River Parrett, the Steart Peninsula, Lilstock, East Quantoxhead and Watchet. Sand dunes at Berrow and a shingle ridge at Steart have been created by winds blowing from the west. On the beach near Stogursey are the remains of a submerged forest dated to 2500 BC. - 6500 BC.

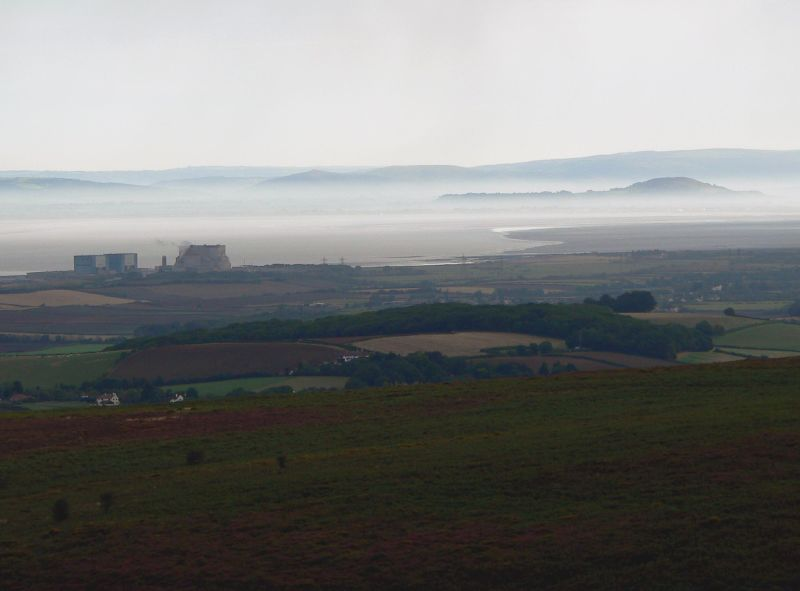
Hinkley Point in Bridgwater Bay. Brent Knoll can be seen

Brean Down is a promontory marking the eastern end of the bay. Made of carboniferous limestone, it is a continuation of the Mendip Hills, and two further continuations are the small islands of Steep Holm and Flat Holm. It is owned by the National Trust, and is rich in wildlife, history and archaeology, as well as being a Site of Special Scientific Interest in its own right. It is bounded by steep cliffs and, at its seaward point, Brean Down Fort built in 1865 and then re-armed in the Second World War. There is evidence of an Iron Age hill fort, prehistoric barrows, field systems and a pagan shrine. The shrine dating from pre-Roman times was re-established as a Romano-Celtic style temple in the mid-4th century and probably succeeded by a small late-4th century Christian oratory. In 1897, following wireless transmissions from Lavernock Point in Wales to Flat Holm, Guglielmo Marconi moved his equipment to Brean Down and set a new distance record for wireless transmission.

At low tide large parts of the bay become mud flats 4 kilometres (2.5 mi) wide, due to the tidal range of 15 metres (49 ft), second only to the Bay of Fundy in Eastern Canada. The intertidal mud flats are, as a result, potentially dangerous and it is not uncommon for the emergency services to mount rescue operations on them. Following the death of Lelaina Hall off Berrow in 2002, a local fund raising campaign succeeded in purchasing a Swedish-built BBV6 rescue hovercraft. The hovercraft is operated by Burnham Area Rescue Boat (BARB) in Burnham-on-Sea. Much of the coastline within the western part of the reserve is accessible via a waymarked public footpath, and the South West Coast Path begins at Minehead at the western end of the bay. The tidal range holds potential for energy generation and plans for a tidal barrage in the bay have been considered.

Hinkley Point is a headland extending into Bridgwater Bay 5 miles (8.0 km) west of Burnham-on-Sea, close to the mouth of the River Parrett. The landscape of Hinkley Point is dominated by two nuclear power stations: Hinkley Point A - Magnox (now closed) and Hinkley Point B - AGR. A third, twin-unit European Pressurized Reactor (EPR) reactor is under construction, and will become Hinkley Point C.

Man-made sea defenses include a sea wall at Burnham-on-Sea and a 3 kilometres (1.9 mi) section south from Brean Down. There are also sand dune belts which are managed for their protective function and as a wildlife habitat. There are some concerns that the proposed Severn Barrage could leave some sites high and dry, and others permanently under water. The Steart Peninsula has flooded many times during the last millennium. The most severe recent floods occurred in 1981. By 1997, a combination of coastal erosion, sea level rise and wave action had made some of the defences distinctly fragile and at risk from failure. As a result, in 2002 The Environment Agency produced the Stolford to Combwich Coastal Defence Strategy Study to examine options for the future.

The foreshore at Watchet, which lies at the mouth of the Washford River, and on the edge of Exmoor National Park, is rocky, but has a small harbour. The cliffs between Watchet and Blue Anchor show a distinct pale, greenish blue colour, resulting from the coloured alabaster found there. The name "Watchet" or "Watchet Blue" was used in the 16th century to denote this colour.

East Quantoxhead used to have a small harbour which brought in limestone for local limekilns and exported alabaster. It is thought that it was also used for smuggling.

At Kilve are the remains of a red brick retort, built in 1924, when it was discovered that the shale found in the cliffs was rich in oil. The beach is part of the Blue Anchor to Lilstock Coast SSSI (Site of Special Scientific Interest). Along this coast the cliffs are layered with compressed strata of oil-bearing shale and blue, yellow and brown lias embedded with fossils. In 1924 Forbes-Leslie founded the Shaline Company to exploit them. This retort house is thought to be the first structure erected here for the conversion of shale to oil but the company was unable to raise sufficient capital and this is now all that remains of the anticipated Somerset oil boom.

== Fishing ==
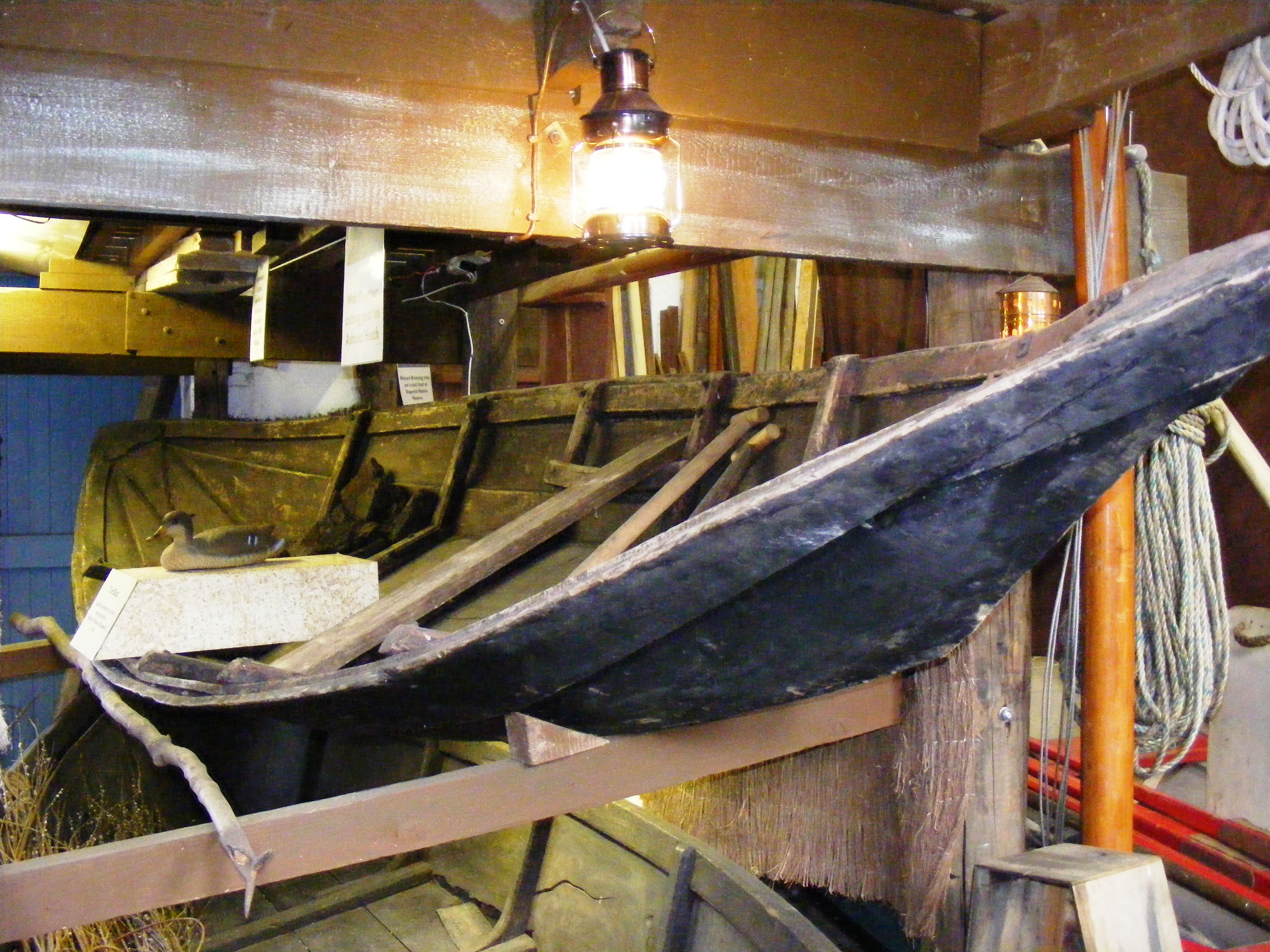
Flatner in the Watchet Boat Museum.

The intertidal mud flats of the bay have a long history of use for fishing, with structures on Stert Flats being dated by dendrochronological analysis to between 932 and 966. It is the last site in England used for 'mudhorse fishing' in which a wooden sledge is propelled across the mudflats to collect fish from nets. Catches include: Thinlip mullet, plaice, dogfish, cuttlefish, skate, shrimp, prawns, sea bass, and sole. Watchet Boat Museum displays the unusual local flatner boats which were used for fishing in the bay, along with associated artefacts.

== Ecology ==
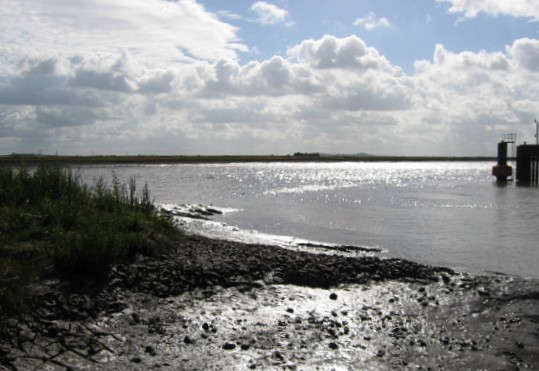
Tidal mudflats at Combwich, near the mouth of the River Parrett on Bridgwater Bay

At low tide extensive areas of mudflats (the Steart and the Berrow Flats) are exposed, providing important feeding and overwintering grounds for waders (shorebirds). Invertebrate fauna including six nationally rare species and eighteen nationally scarce species can be found in the ditches and ponds around the shores. Consequently, Bridgwater Bay is a national nature reserve, and is managed by Natural England. Some of the potential risks to wildlife are highlighted in the local Oil Spill Contingency Plan.

Brean Down, Berrow Dunes and Blue Anchor to Lilstock Coast Sites of Special Scientific Interest (SSSI) are included in the national nature reserve which is designated as a wetland of international importance under the Ramsar Convention. It is also a Nature Conservation Review Grade 1* site, meaning it is included in Derek Ratcliffe's book listing the most important places for nature conservation in Great Britain.

=== Flora ===
Common cord-grass (Spartina anglica) was planted in the area in the 1990s. It can now be found on surrounding marshes where it has invaded the fronting mudflats. The Spartina is generally shorter in the bay than at other sites due to the high tides and the turbidity of the water, reaching around 30 centimetres (11.8 in) as opposed to 150 centimetres (59.1 in) elsewhere. On higher ground common saltmarsh-grass (Puccinellia maritima) can be found along with sea aster (Aster tripolium). Where the land is ungrazed, common reed (Phragmites australis) often forms a zone above the sea aster. Where the upper marsh is grazed by cattle red fescue (Festuca rubra) and creeping bent (Agrostis stolonifera) are found. The area of marsh furthest from the sea supports Sea couch (Agropyron pungens) and sea club-rush (Scirpus maritimus).

The nationally scarce bulbous foxtail (Alopecurus bulbosus), slender hare's-ear (Bupleurum tenuissimum) and sea barley (Hordeum marinum) are grazed by sheep on the marshes around the bay. Around Stert Island the nationally rare compact brome (Bromus madritensis) and nationally scarce Ray's knotgrass (Polygonum oxyspermum) can be found.

The ditches are populated with aquatic and bankside plant species. These include the nationally restricted rootless duckweed (Wolffia arrhiza). Other uncommon species such as frogbit (Hydrocharis morsus-ranae) and water fern (Azolla filiculoides) can also be found. The nationally restricted brackish water-crowfoot (Ranunculus baudotii) and sea clubrush (Scirpus maritimus) indicate the slightly brackish nature of the water.

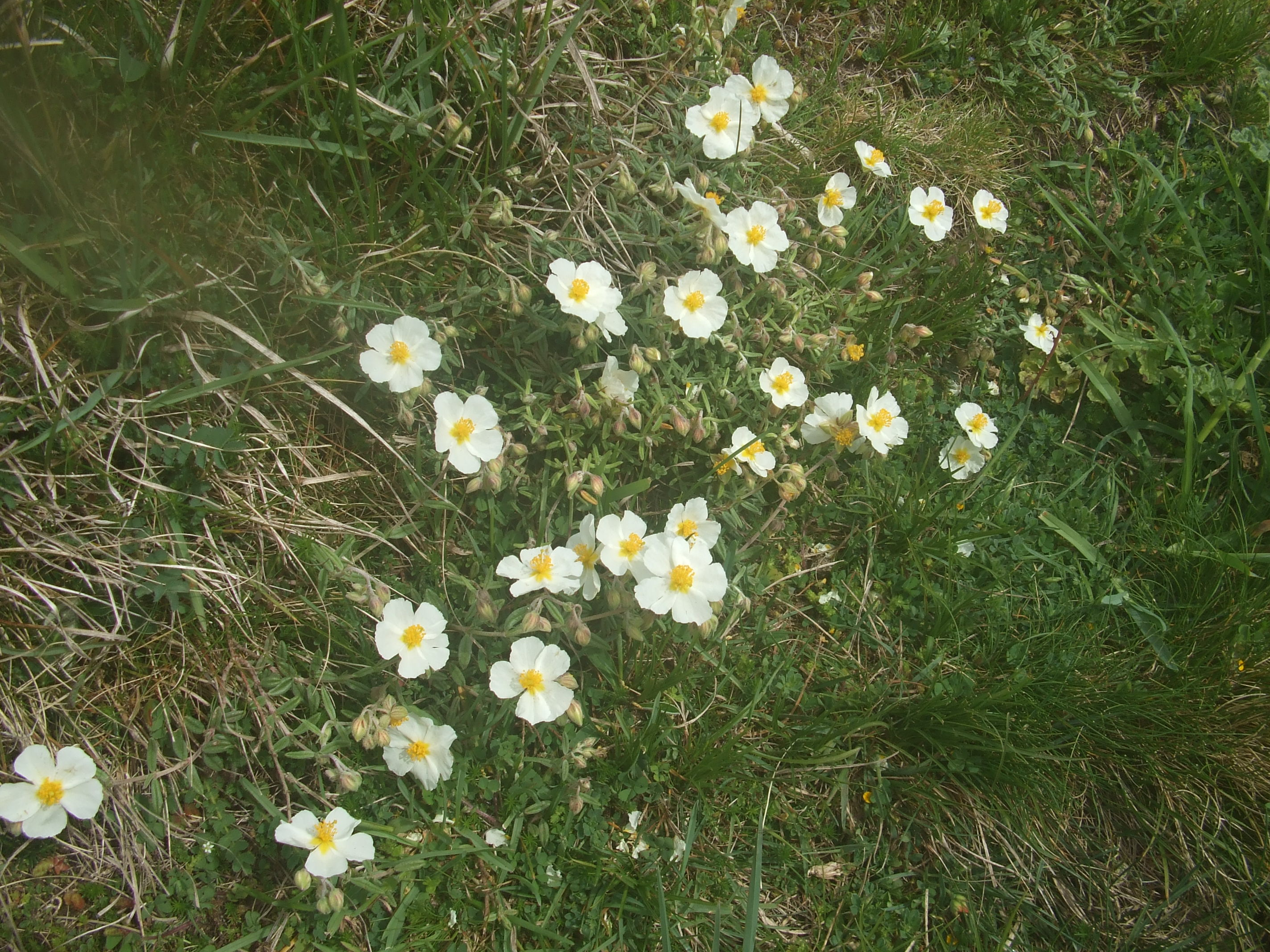
White rock-rose (Helianthemum apenninum) on the south cliff of Brean Down

Brean Down is a site for the nationally rare white rock-rose (Helianthemum apenninum), which occurs in abundance on the upper reaches of the grassy south-facing slopes. Some of the broomrapes growing near Bridgwater Bay, which were originally thought to be oxtongue broomrape (Orobanche artemisiae-campestriae), are now no longer believed to be this species, but atypical specimens of ivy broomrape (Orobanche hederae) Other plants on the southern slopes include the Somerset hair grass, wild thyme, horseshoe vetch and birds-foot-trefoil. The northern side is dominated by bracken, bramble, privet, hawthorn, cowslips and bell heather.

=== Fauna ===
Five Red Data Book invertebrate species have been recorded in the area. These include: soldier flies Odontomyia ornata and Stratiomys singularior, hover fly Lejops vittata, the great silver water beetle (Hydrophilus piceus), and the water beetle Hydrovatus clypealis. Nationally scarce species include the aquatic snail Gyraulus laevis, the hairy dragonfly (Brachytron pratense), and the ladybird Coccidula scutellata.

Over 190 species of birds have been identified near the bay, some of which use it as a feeding ground during their migrations. Waders and wildfowl often over-winter on the reserve. The populations of Eurasian whimbrel (Numenius phaeopus) and black-tailed godwit (Limosa limosa) are internationally important. Significant populations of dunlin (Calidris alpina) and wigeon (Anas penelope) also frequent the bay. In early winter the wigeon select Puccinellia maritima in preference to Agrostis stolonifera and Festuca rubra. Avocets have become regular autumn and winter visitors to the area in recent years, favouring the lower reaches of the River Parrett, and, for the first time in over 50 years, bred on the reserve in 2012.

Rare vagrant species spotted in the area include lesser yellowlegs, white-rumped sandpiper, Pallid Harrier (in spring) and Richard's pipit (in autumn). The birds seen on Brean Down include peregrine falcon, western jackdaw, kestrel, collared and stock doves, common whitethroat, linnet, stonechat, dunnock and rock pipit. There are also several species of butterfly, including chalkhill blue, dark green fritillary, meadow brown, marbled white, small heath, and common blue.

== See also ==
- Bridgwater tidal barrier
