= St Andrew's Church, Steart =

Church in Somerset, England

St Andrew's Church
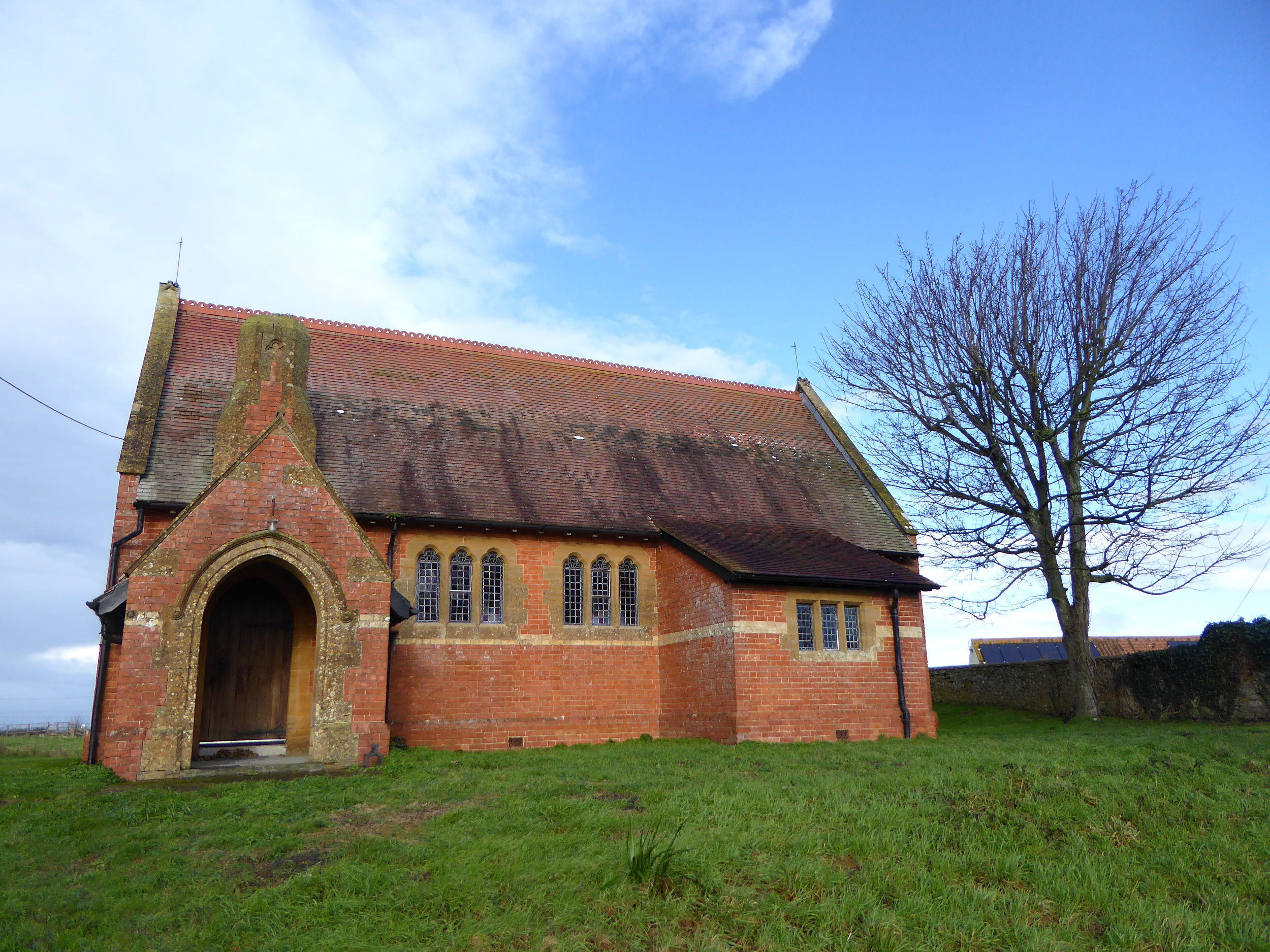
- St Andrew's Church

Religion
- Affiliation: Church of England
- Ecclesiastical or organizational status: Active

Location
- Location: Steart, Somerset, England
- Interactive map of St Andrew's Church
- Coordinates: 51.2074°N 3.0433°W

Architecture
- Architects: Messrs Foster and Wood of Bristol
- Type: Church
- Completed: 1882

St Andrew's Church is a Church of England church in Steart, Somerset, England. The church, which was built in 1882, is now used for services periodically.

== History ==
St Andrew's was erected as a chapel of ease to the parish church of St Mary Magdalene, Stockland Bristol, at the expense of Rev. Henry A. Daniel, vicar of the parish between 1857 and 1883, for £700. The vicar also provided the church with an endowment of over £1,000 under the requirement that at least one Sunday service would be held there each week. Rev. Daniel embarked on the scheme as the residents of the isolated village of Steart, largely fishermen and their families, were a considerable distance from all three nearby parishes and their churches: Stockland Bristol, Otterhampton and Combwich.

The church was designed by Messrs Foster and Wood of Bristol and was constructed by Messrs Joseph Willis and Son of Bridgwater. St Andrew's opened on 30 November 1882.

On 6 July 1962, the Bishop of Bath and Wells, Rev. Edward Henderson, dedicated a newly created pathway and gate to the church, which had been formed across land donated by Stanley Stone of Church Farm. St Andrew's had previously only been accessible by crossing through a field. The dedication was requested by Patrick Daniel, a descendant of Rev. Daniel, and marked the first formal visit by a Bishop of the Diocese to Steart.

The church received serious damage to its roof on the night of 21 June 1986, when the bell turret was struck by lightning and collapsed during storms that hit southwest England. The Sunday service due to be held the following day was transferred to the parish church. It was subsequently restored, but the turret was not replaced.

The church is one of seven churches belonging to the Quantock Gate Parishes, a benefice of five parishes. The parish church of St Mary's remains the main place of worship in the parish of Stockland Bristol, but services continue to be held at St Andrew's approximately three to four times a year. The church is also open for visitors and prayer on a daily basis.

== Architecture ==
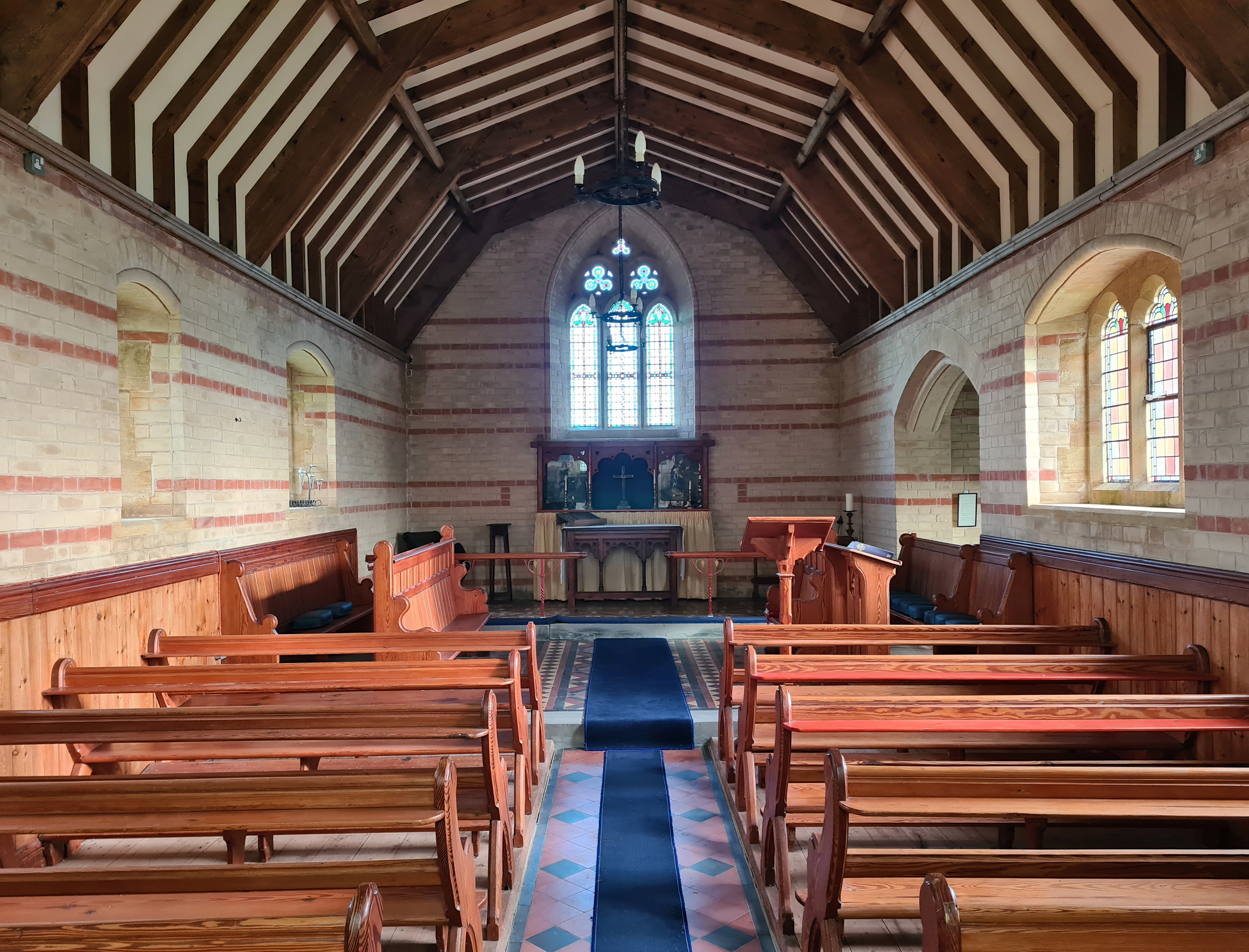
The interior of St Andrew's Church.

St Andrew's is built of red brick in the Early English style, with Staffordshire tiles on its roof. It was constructed with double walls, a bordered ceiling and bell turret. The interior is made up of a nave, south porch and vestry. The original seats were made from pitch pine and the windows filled with cathedral glass.
