= Steart Peninsula =

Peninsula in Somerset, England

Coordinates: 51°12′36″N 3°02′06″W

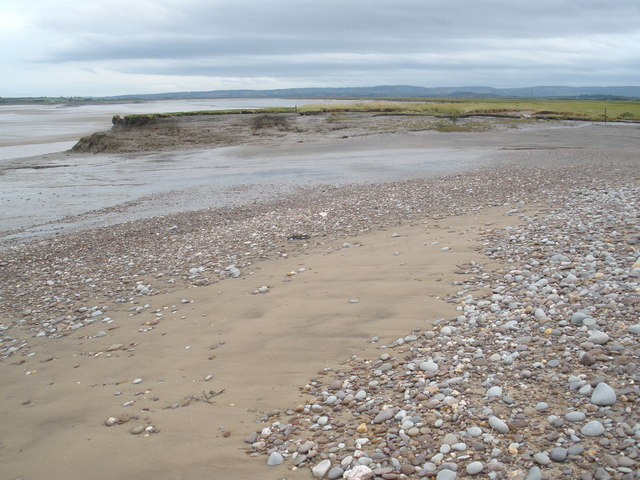
Stert Point

The Steart Peninsula (grid reference ST274459) is a peninsula in Somerset, England. At its outermost tip is Fenning Island (now joined to the mainland), at the tip of which is Stert Point (sometimes spelt Steart Point) which is the eastern end of the West Somerset Coast Path. North of Stert Point lies Stert Island, which was joined to the peninsula until about 1798. The peninsula consists largely of low-lying flat farmland, and projects northwards on the west side of Stockland Reach, the lower stretches of the estuary of the River Parrett.

The main settlement on the peninsula is the village of Steart, but two other villages, Stockland Bristol and Otterhampton sit at the peninsula's base. A single minor road links the village of Steart to these other villages. The River Parrett Trail runs along the peninsula.

West of the peninsula are the villages of Stolford and Hinkley Point, and to the south is the village of Combwich.

From 1927 to the 1950s, Stert Flats, the mudflats north-west of the peninsula, were used as an RAF range, the Stert Flats Air Gunnery and Bombing Range. A few structures from this time remain.

== Nature reserves ==
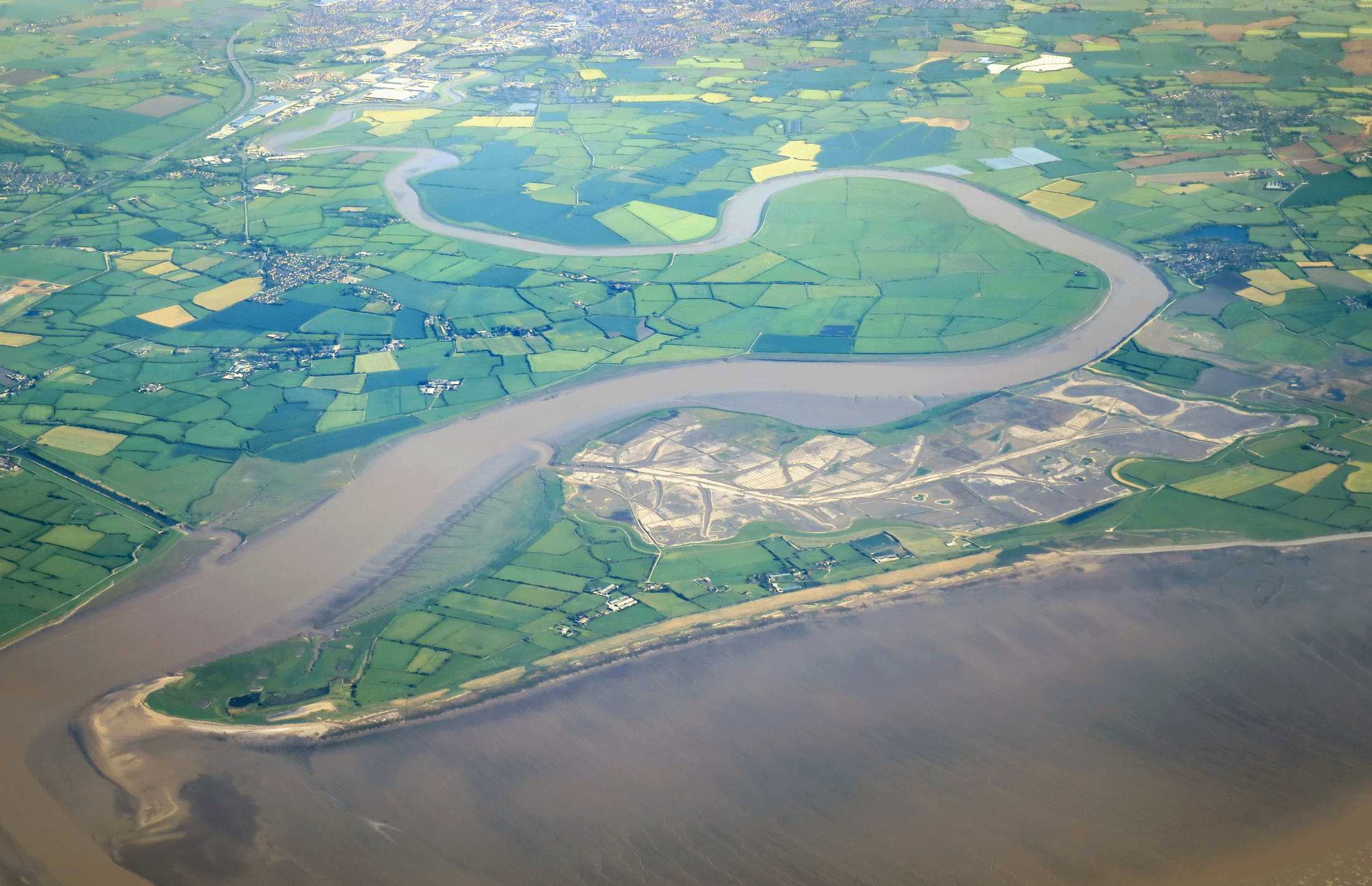
Aerial view of the Steart Peninsula

There are two nature reserves on the peninsula. A third reserve is being developed by the Royal Society for the Protection of Birds.

=== Bridgwater Bay National Nature Reserve ===
Bridgwater Bay, a national nature reserve, lies on the northern side of the peninsula. The reserve includes the largest area of salt marsh in Somerset, and large expanses of mudflats exposed at low tide, important feeding and roosting sites for waterfowl and wading birds. There are four bird hides in the north of the reserve, near the tip of the peninsula. Adjoining the reserve are three coastal commons — from west to east these are Catsford Common, Wall Common and Steart Common.

=== Steart Marshes ===
The Steart Marshes are a major wetland reserve on the south side of the peninsula, completed in 2014 and managed by the Wildfowl and Wetlands Trust. The reserve is the result of a flood management project, which involved a breach in the sea wall to permit seawater to enter the salt marsh from the tidal River Parrett.

The Steart peninsula has flooded many times during the last millennium. The most severe recent floods occurred in 1981. By 1997, a combination of coastal erosion, current sea level rise and wave action had made some of the defences distinctly fragile and at risk from failure. As a result in 2002 The Environment Agency produced the Stolford to Combwich Coastal Defence Strategy Study to examine options for the future. In July 2010, the Environment Agency presented a plan to convert the peninsula into wetland habitat, costing £17–20 million, which included land purchase costs of £5–7 million. It was the largest wetland habitat creation scheme in England. Work began on the programme in May 2012 and was completed in September 2014. An Environment Agency spokesman said "The Steart project will directly protect homes, businesses and the surrounding infrastructure. Salt marsh is a natural flood risk management scheme. Like coral reefs or mangroves in the tropics, salt marsh takes energy out of the tide and reduces wave height."
