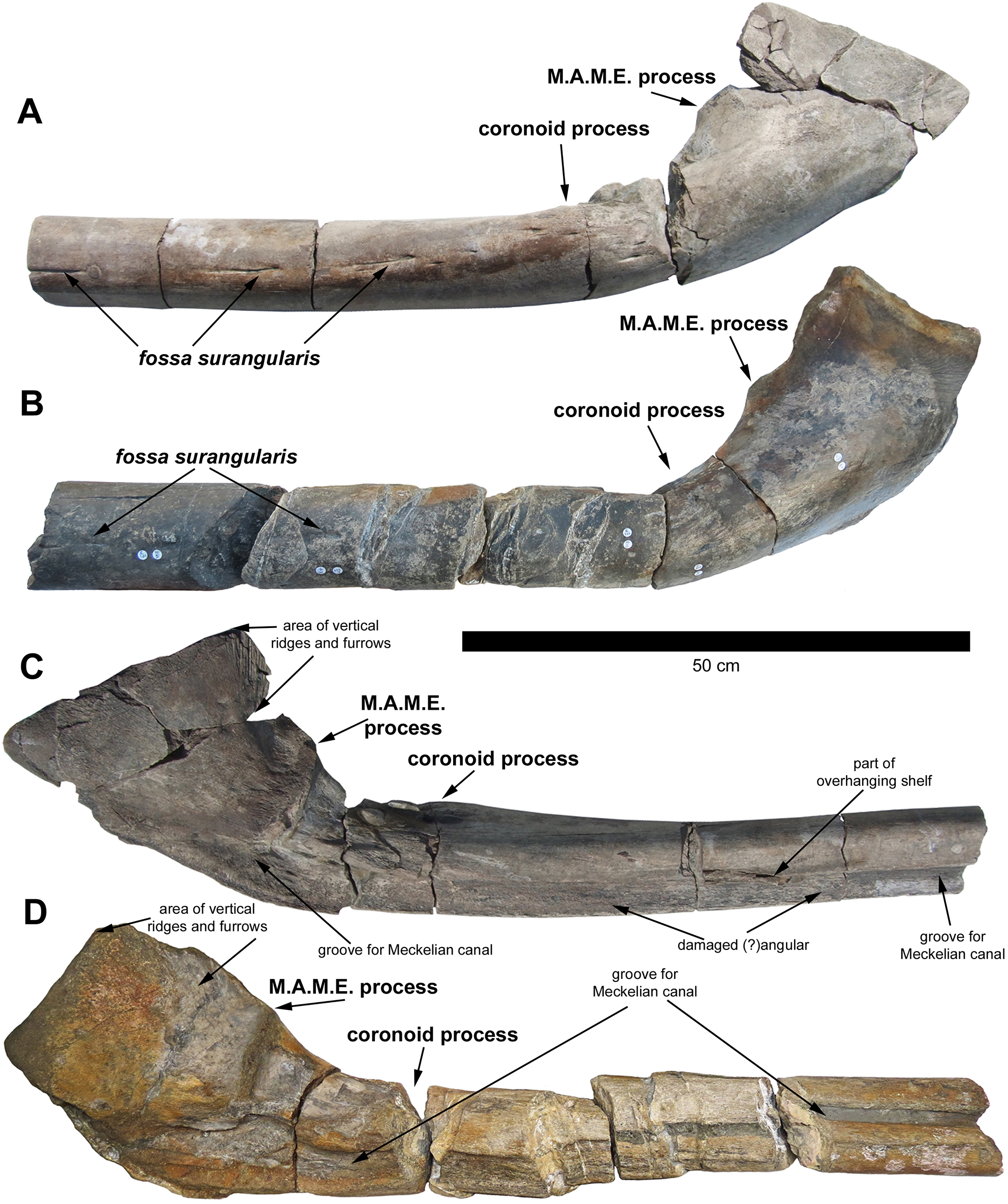
- Holotype (A, C) and referred (B, D) specimens of Ichthyotitan

Scientific classification
- Kingdom: Animalia
- Phylum: Chordata
- Class: Reptilia
- Order: †Ichthyosauria
- Family: †Shastasauridae (?)
- Genus: †Ichthyotitan; Lomax et al., 2024
- Species: †I. severnensis

Binomial name
- †Ichthyotitan severnensis Lomax et al., 2024

= Ichthyotitan =

Ichthyotitan Temporal range: Late Triassic (Rhaetian), 205–202 Ma

Genus of giant ichthyosaurs

Ichthyotitan (/ˌɪkθiəˈtaɪtən/ IK-thee-ə-TY-tən) is an extinct genus of giant ichthyosaur from the Late Triassic (Rhaetian), known from the Westbury Mudstone Formation in Somerset, England. It is believed to be a shastasaurid, extending the family's range by 13 million years up to the latest Triassic. The discovery of Ichthyotitan has been considered evidence that shastasaurids were still thriving until their disappearance in the Triassic–Jurassic extinction event.

The genus contains a single species, I. severnensis. It is known from two fragmentary surangular bones of the lower jaw, discovered in separate places in 2016 and 2020. Other specimens throughout Western Europe have been linked to the species based on similar osteological features, although their affiliation is uncertain. Estimates scaling up the bones from other ichthyosaur species put Ichthyotitan's body length at nearly 25 metres (82 ft), which would make it the largest marine reptile currently known.

== Discovery and naming ==
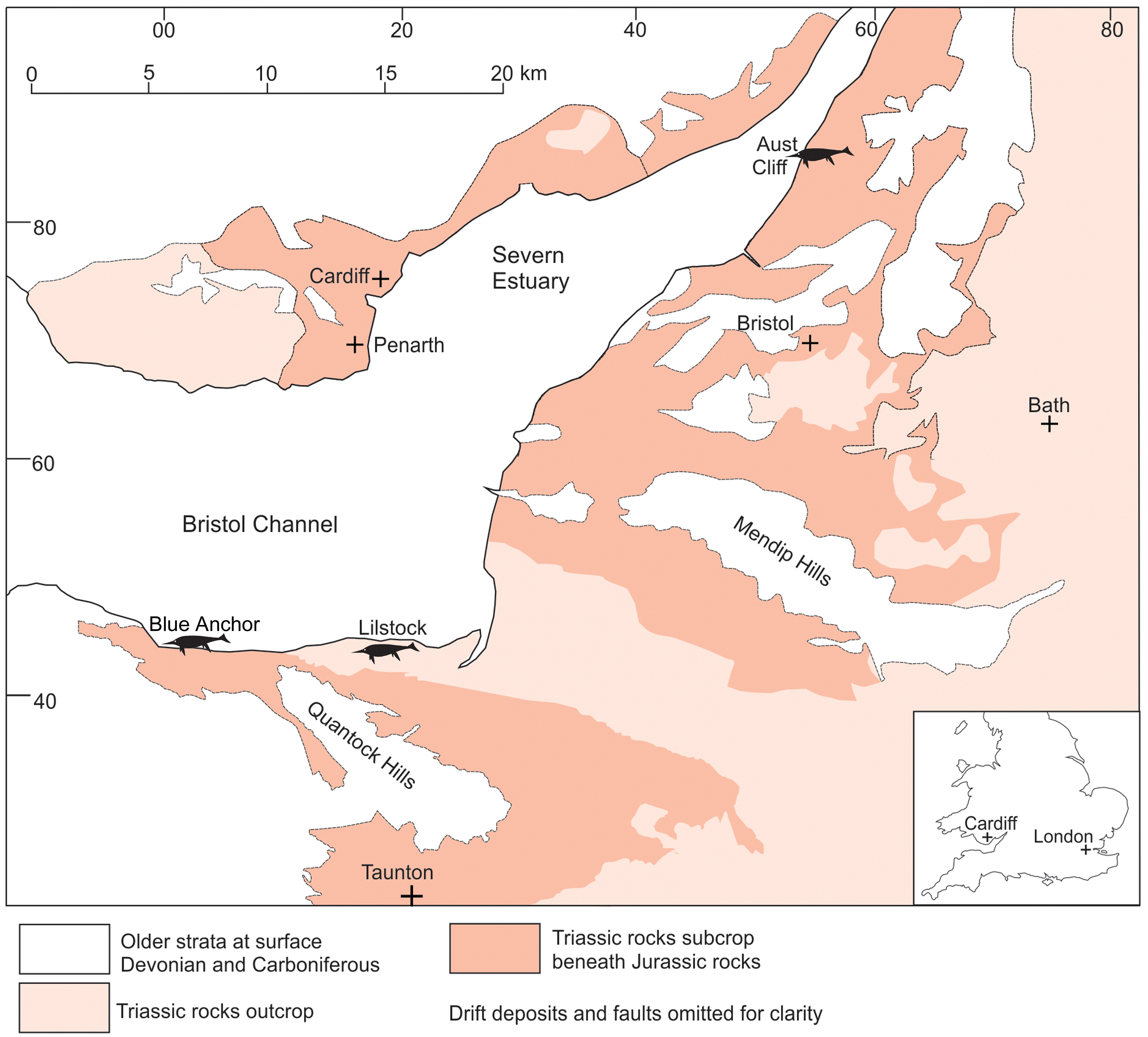
Localities where Ichthyotitan-affiliated specimens have been found around the Bristol Channel and Severn Estuary

=== Lilstock specimen ===
The first specimen later referred to Ichthyotitan, BRSMG Cg2488 (the "Lilstock specimen"), was found in 2016 by researcher and fossil collector Paul de la Salle in the Westbury Formation. It consists of a partial left surangular measuring 96 centimetres (3.15 ft) long. In 2018, Dean Lomax, Paul de la Salle, Judy Massare, and Ramues Gallois identified the Lilstock specimen as belonging to a shastasaurid. This also prompted the authors to reinterpret large bones in nearby Aust Cliff, previously considered to be from large terrestrial archosaurs, as possible giant ichthyosaur fragments from the surangular, hyoid or other jaw bones.

Another smaller jaw fragment from a giant ichthyosaur is known from Lilstock; it is stored in a private collection and still remains undescribed.

=== BAS specimen and naming ===
The Ichthyotitan holotype specimen, BRSMG Cg3178 (the "BAS specimen"), was discovered in sediments of the Westbury Formation near Blue Anchor in Somerset. The first fragment was found on 28 May 2020 by 11-year-old Ruby Reynolds, while looking for fossils on the beach at Blue Anchor with her father, fossil collector Justin Reynolds. They contacted researcher Dean Lomax, who himself reached out to Paul de la Salle. Subsequent expeditions were led by the team, revealing additional pieces until 16 October 2022, and known parts of the surangular, a lower jaw-bone, were reassembled in that same year. While incomplete, the surangular, an element representing only part of the entire lower jaw length, has been estimated to have measured more than 2 metres (6.6 ft) in total.

The specimen consists of fragments of a right surangular, more complete than the Lilstock specimen, with some fragments possibly belonging to the angular bone. Histological features suggest that the specimen was still growing, so was either a subadult or a young adult. Multiple encrusting organisms, including bivalves, are present, as well as possible signs of scavenging. It is scheduled to be displayed at the Bristol Museum and Art Gallery.

Other fragmentary remains were discovered but not identified with the holotype specimen, including two large rib sections from another potential giant ichthyosaur, found at a higher stratigraphic level.

In 2024, Lomax et al. described Ichthyotitan severnensis as a new genus and species of probable shastasaurid ichthyosaur based on BRSMG Cg3178 and BRSMG Cg2488. The generic name, Ichthyotitan, combines a reference to ichthyosaurs—meaning "fish lizard", derived from the Greek word ἰχθύς (ikhthús), meaning "fish"—with the Greek suffix -τιτάν (-titan), meaning "giant". The specific name, severnensis, references the Severn Estuary near the type locality.

=== Other possible remains ===
Other fragmentary remains of giant ichthyosaurs of a similar age to Ichthyotitan have also been reported from Germany (Bonenburg district of Warburg) and France (Autun and Cuers).

The Cuers specimen is known from fragments discovered in two separate excavations, but believed to represent a single specimen. A small rostrum fragment believed to be a premaxilla (MHNTV PAL-1-10/2012) and a long mandible fragment (MHNTV PAL-2/2010) are known, as well as vertebral centra and rib fragments associated to both collection numbers. It was originally described as shastasaurid-like, with flattened centra similar to Shonisaurus and Himalayasaurus, and an aulacodont dentition analogous to Shastasaurus. The morphology of the posterior jaw was considered unique at the time of discovery, but has since been linked to Ichthyotitan specimens.

== Description ==
Ichthyotitan is the only shastasaurid and giant ichthyosaur to be known from the Rhaetian, found in the fossil record 13 million years after their relatives. The lineage is believed to have gone extinct immediately after in the Triassic–Jurassic extinction event, with later ichthyosaurs never reaching similar sizes until their extinction in the early Late Cretaceous.

=== Size estimates ===
Estimated size of Ichthyotitan compared to a human

While the incompleteness of the material referred to Ichthyotitan makes its size difficult to determine, it was clearly very large. By comparing the Lilstock surangular to the same bone in Shastasaurus sikanniensis as a model, the researchers estimated the Lilstock ichthyosaur to have been around 26 metres (85 ft) long or 25% larger by direct scaling, nearly the size of a blue whale. Scaling based on the height at the coronoid process compared to Besanosaurus found a shorter length estimate of 22 metres (72 ft). Researchers pointed out that, while differences in proportions between species make these estimates speculative, they were conventional given the scarcity of material.

The 2024 study describing Ichthyotitan pointed out inaccuracies in the Besanosaurus scaling, due to a misidentification of the coronoid process with the nearby MAME (muscle adductor mandibulae externus) process. Comparing the position of the MAME process in the BAS specimen to that in Besanosaurus, they provided a revised length estimate of 25 metres (82 ft), likely making it the largest marine reptile ever described.

The Aust specimens, tentatively linked to Ichthyotitan, have been informally estimated to be even larger at 30 to 35 metres (98 to 115 ft) long.

=== Bone anatomy ===
Apart from its size, features of the surangular bone distinguish Ichthyotitan from other shastasaurids. The surangular is spatulate at its posterior end and shows an almost 90-degree upwards turn. This is consistent in both the Lilstock and BAS specimens, ruling out taphonomic distortion. In comparison, other shastasaurids show a much less marked curvature. An extensive MAME process is present for muscle attachment. Another thin process, posterior to the latter, shows vertical ridges and furrows on its medial side, and has also been reported in the Cuers specimen.

The coronoid process is also less prominent laterally than in Shonisaurus, while the shaft shows a subcircular rather than oblong cross-section at that position. While less well-preserved, the anterior part of the surangular bears a lateral groove believed to represent the continuation of the fossa surangularis, also known from the Cuers specimen.

Another bone fragment is believed to correspond to the angular bone by comparison with Cymbospondylus youngorum, running ventrally across the entire length of the surangular in the BAS specimen. While a suture is present between the two bones, it disappears in a section anterior to the coronoid process. Along with the continuous bone structure, this implies that the bones were possibly fused in life, a unique condition among ichthyosaurs. Researchers speculate that this was related to Ichthyotitan's large size and the individual's maturity. This morphology was also observed in one of the Aust bones, and is believed to also be present in the Lilstock specimen despite poorer preservation. Similarly, unique patterns of periosteal growth in Ichthyotitan are believed to have played a role in approaching the biological size limits in vertebrates.

== Paleoecology ==
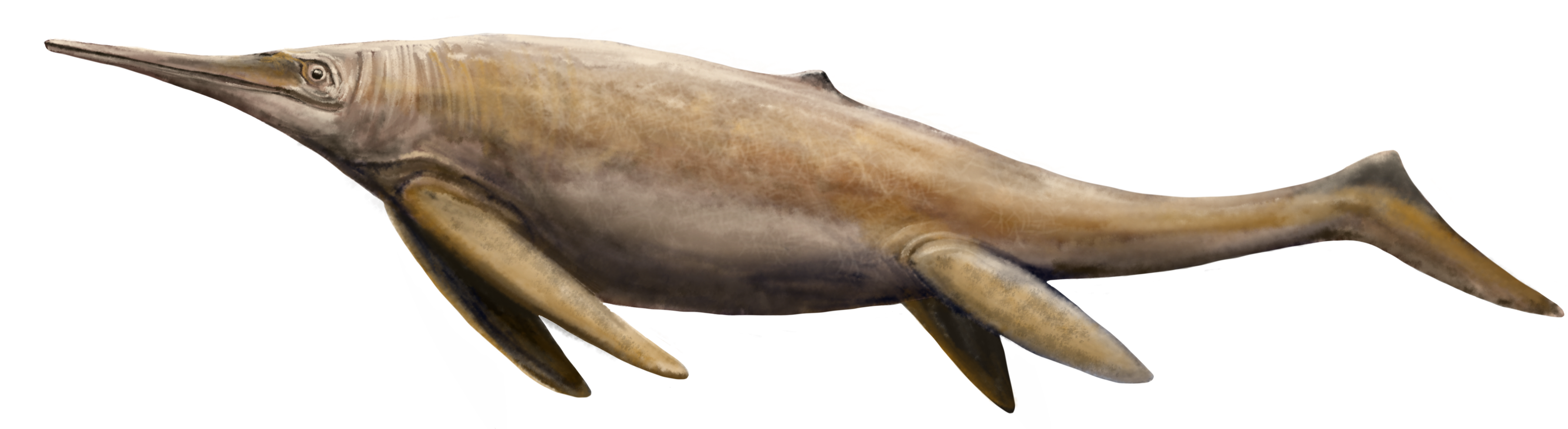
Speculative life restoration

Older studies have suggested that shastasaurids were suction-feeders, but current research indicates that the jaws of shastasaurid ichthyosaurs do not fit the suction-feeding profile. This is because their short and narrow hyoid bones are unsuitable to withstand impact forces for such kind of feeding and some species like Shonisaurus had robust sectorial teeth with gut contents of mollusc shells and vertebrates.

Ichthyotitan is believed to have been a predator, hunting smaller prey including other marine reptiles in a fashion similar to an orca. This has been taken as evidence for the richness of marine food webs throughout the Triassic, believed to be built upon newly evolved forms of plankton, and would show that shastasaurids were flourishing until their disappearance in the end-Triassic extinction. Their ecology made their remains vulnerable to scavengers, with one of the fossils showing signs of scavenging before burial, explaining the scarcity of known fossils.
