= West Somerset Coast Path =

Long-distance footpath in Somerset, England

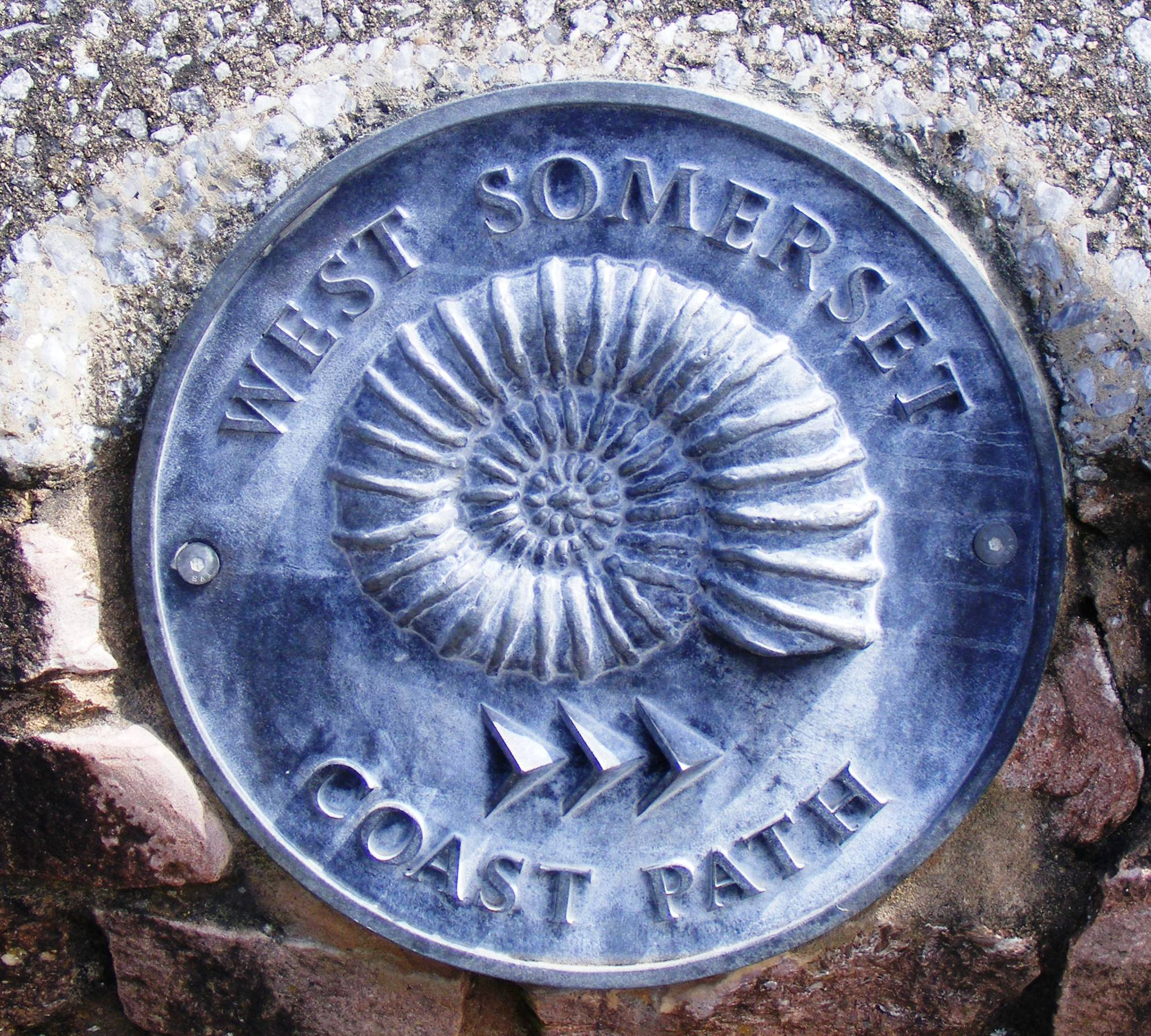
- West Somerset Coast Path sign
- Length: 25 mi (40 km)
- Location: Somerset, England
- Designation: UK National Trail
- Trailheads: Minehead, Steart Peninsula
- Use: Hiking
- Lowest point: Sea level
- Season: All year

The West Somerset Coast Path is a long-distance footpath that links the northern end of the South West Coast Path to the River Parrett Trail in Somerset, England, UK.

In March 2016 a 58 miles (93 km) stretch of the England Coast Path from Brean Down to Minehead, which incorporates the West Somerset Coast Path, was opened and designated as part of the England Coast Path.

== Route ==
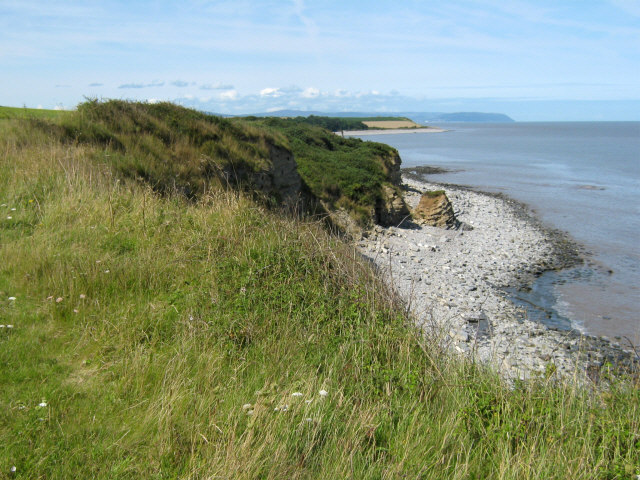
View east of Lilstock

It runs from the hamlet of Steart on the Steart Peninsula, and passes through the villages of Kilve, West Quantoxhead, Williton, Watchet, Blue Anchor, and Dunster beach to Minehead.

The beach at Kilve was described by William Wordsworth, the Romantic poet, as "Kilve's delightful shore". Kilve Pill, where the stream from Holford runs into the sea, was once a tiny port, used for importing culm, an inferior type of coal which was used in the limeburning process. It was also the site for "glatting" which was the hunting of conger eels by dogs. On the shore a Saint Keyne serpent can be seen, which a local legend says is a snake turned to stone, but is in reality an ammonite. It is just possible to make out the remains of a stone jetty and the ruins of a lime kiln nearby. Here the limestone was burnt to provide farmers with the lime to spread on their fields. The limestone carrier Laurina was wrecked at Kilve in 1876.

From Williton to Minehead the route is close to the track of the West Somerset Railway which opened in 1862 and was extended from Watchet to Minehead by the Minehead Railway in 1874. Although just a single track, improvements were needed in the first half of the twentieth century to accommodate the significant number of tourists that wished to travel to the Somerset coast. Despite this traffic it was closed in 1971 but was then reopened in 1976 as a heritage railway.

Watchet is a harbour town, which, according to the Anglo-Saxon Chronicle, was plundered by Danes led by Ohtor and Rhoald in 987 and 997. It is known that it was in frequent use by small boats in 1564 possibly for the import of salt and wine from France. During the English Civil War Royalist reinforcements for the siege of Dunster Castle was sent by sea, but the tide was on the ebb and a troop of Roundheads rode into the shallows and forced the ship to surrender, so a ship at sea was taken by a troop of horse. The primitive jetty was damaged in a storm of 1659 and a larger, stronger pier was built in the early 18th century supported by local wool merchants, although by 1797 the largest export was kelp made by burning seaweed for use in glass making. In the 19th century trade increased with the export of iron ore from the Brendon Hills, paper, flour and gypsum. Harbour trade was aided by the coming of the railway. In the mid-1860s two independent railways terminated at Watchet. The West Somerset Mineral Railway ran down from the iron mines on the Brendon Hills, and the West Somerset Railway came up from the Bristol & Exeter Railway at Norton Fitzwarren. Both lines made extensive use of the harbour at Watchet from where iron ore was shipped across the Bristol Channel for smelting at Ebbw Vale in South Wales.

The foreshore at Watchet is rocky, with a high 6 metres (20 ft) tidal range. The cliffs between Watchet and Blue Anchor show a distinct pale, greenish blue colour, resulting from the coloured alabaster found there. The name "Watchet" or "Watchet Blue" was used in the 16th century to denote this colour. Daw's Castle, about 0.5 miles (0.80 km) west of Watchet, is a hill fort situated on a sea cliff about 80 metres (260 ft) above the sea. The fort may be of Iron Age origin, but was (re)built and fortified as a burh by King Alfred, as part of his defence against Viking raids from the Bristol Channel around 878 AD.

The Blue Anchor to Lilstock Coast SSSI is a 742.8 hectare geological Site of Special Scientific Interest. It provides an outstanding series of sections through the Early Jurassic Lower Lias, spanning the Hettangian and Pliensbachian Stages and named the "Lilstock Formation". This sequence and the good Rhaetian succession beneath are repeatedly affected by faulting, making it of interest to geologists and fossil hunters. It also displays coastal geomorphology which demonstrates a particularly well-developed series of intertidal shore platforms varying in width from about 200-600m. The cliff and beach are rich in reptile remains, including complete skeletons. Lilstock also yields ammonites, shells and fish remains. A unique specimen of an ichthyosaur, named Excalibosaurus costini MacGowan, in which the lower jaw is shorter than the upper was found in the Lower Jurassic Sinemurian Stage, Lower Lias beds on the foreshore at Lilstock and is now in the Bristol City Museum and Art Gallery. The Triassic cliffs have geological interest for the variety of fossils. The coloured alabaster found in the cliffs gave rise to the name of the colour "Watchet Blue".

Dunster Beach, which includes the mouth of the River Avill, is located half a mile from the village, and used to have a significant harbour, known as Dunster Haven, which was used for the export of wool from Saxon times; however, it was last used in the 17th century and has now disappeared among the dykes, meadows and marshes near the shore. The beach site has a number of privately owned beach huts (or chalets as some owners call them) along with a small shop, a tennis court and a putting green. The chalets, measuring 18 by 14 feet (5.5 by 4.3 m), can be let out for holidays; some owners live in them all the year round.

== Route and points of interest ==
Point	Coordinates (Links to map resources)	OS Grid Ref	Notes
Start	51.209°N 3.034°W	ST278461	Steart on the Steart Peninsula
Lilstock	51.200°N 3.192°W	ST167452	
Kilve	51.192°N 3.226°W	ST143443	
West Quantoxhead	51.181°N 3.272°W	ST111432	
Watchet	51.182°N 3.329°W	ST072434	
Blue Anchor	51.182°N 3.399°W	ST022434	
Dunster	51.194°N 3.430°W	ST001449	
End	51.209°N 3.472°W	SS972466	Minehead
