= Steart =

Village in Somerset, England

Coordinates: 51.208°N 3.042°W

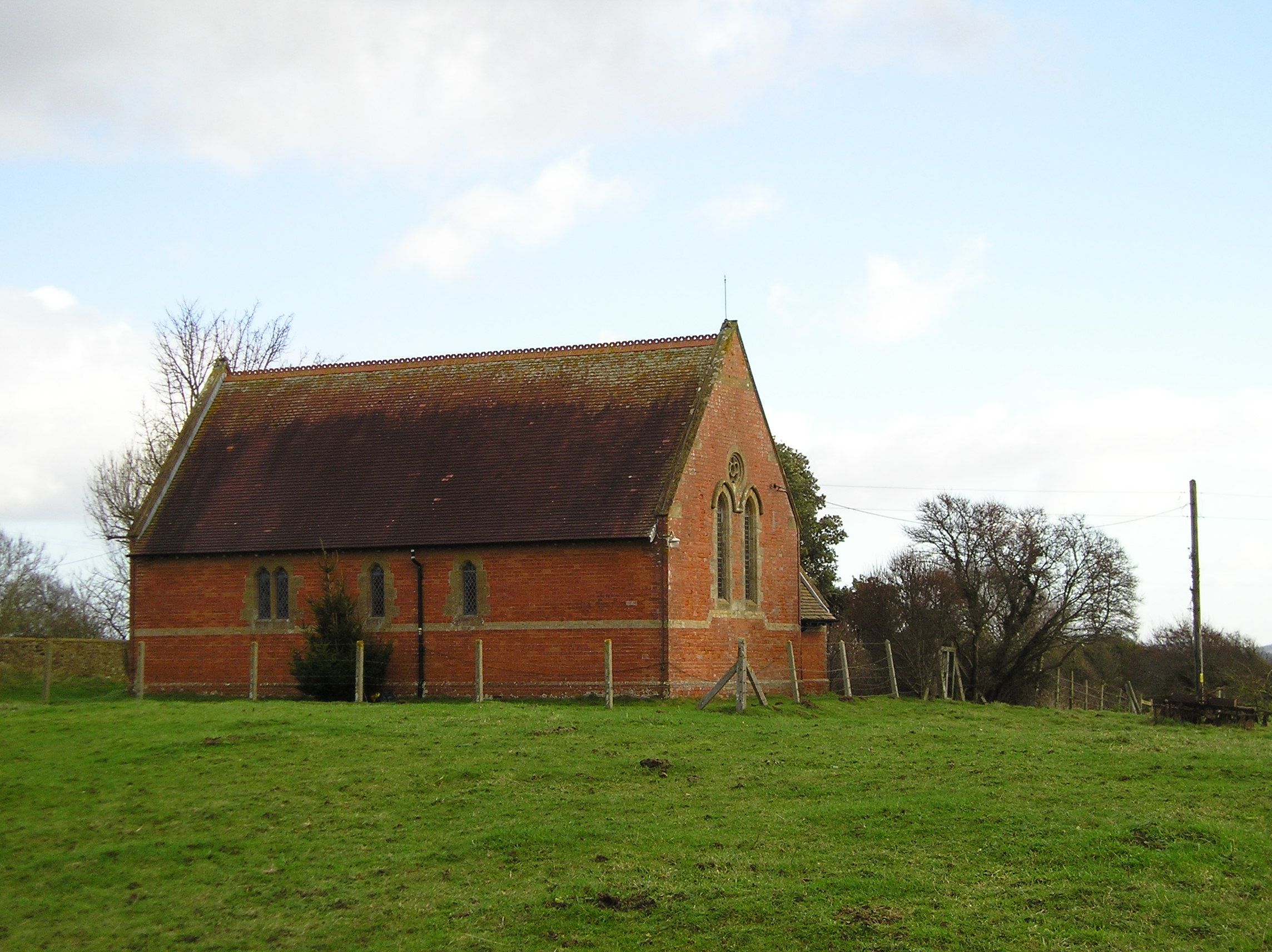
- St Andrews Church, Steart

- Location within Somerset
- OS grid reference: ST270458
- Civil parish: Otterhampton
- Unitary authority: Somerset
- Ceremonial county: Somerset
- Region: South West
- Country: England
- Sovereign state: United Kingdom
- Post town: BRIDGWATER
- Postcode district: TA5
- Dialling code: 01278
- Police: Avon and Somerset
- Fire: Devon and Somerset
- Ambulance: South Western
- UK Parliament: Bridgwater

Steart (pronounced Ste-art), historically also called Stert, is a small village in Somerset, England. It lies in an isolated position on the Steart Peninsula on the Bristol Channel coast, about 6 miles (10 km) north of Bridgwater.

The toponym is derived from the Old English steort, meaning "tail, projecting piece of land". Steart was historically in the ancient parish of Stockland Bristol, except for the foreshore on the Bristol Channel coast, which was in the parish of Stogursey. In 1885 it was transferred to the civil parish of Otterhampton.

A medieval chapel at Steart was disused by 1611. The church of St Andrew was built in 1882. The Bethel Congregational church was open between 1847 and 1938.

During World War 2, two small radio direction-finding stations were located in Steart. They were part of a secret MI6 organisation called The Radio Security Service listening to and locating the communications of German spies and their handlers. These stations intercepted the messages of the Abwehr, the German Secret Intelligence Service, and provided a large volume of high level intelligence throughout the war. In December 1945, in the nearby village of Combwich The Freedom of Steart was conferred upon Captain Louis Varney, the officer in command of the DF Stations.

The West Somerset Coast Path and River Parrett Trail both start at Steart.
