= Lilstock =

Hamlet in Somerset, England

Coordinates: 51.1978°N 3.1846°W

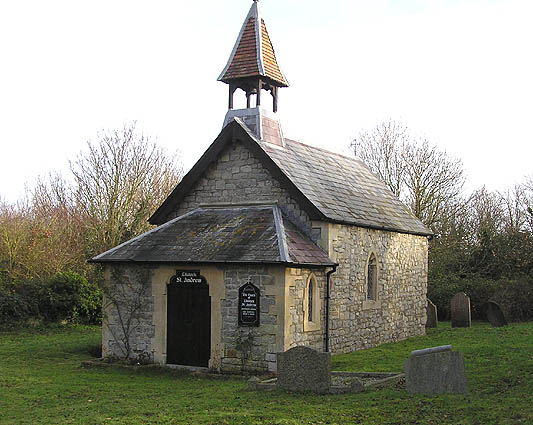
- St Andrew's Church

- Location within Somerset
- OS grid reference: ST173449
- Civil parish: Stringston
- Unitary authority: Somerset
- Ceremonial county: Somerset
- Region: South West
- Country: England
- Sovereign state: United Kingdom
- Post town: BRIDGWATER
- Postcode district: TA5
- Dialling code: 01278
- Police: Avon and Somerset
- Fire: Devon and Somerset
- Ambulance: South Western
- UK Parliament: Tiverton and Minehead

Lilstock is a hamlet in the civil parish of Stringston in Somerset, England. It is 12 miles (19 km) north-west of Bridgwater, and 8 miles (13 km) north-east of Williton. It is on the coast of Bridgwater Bay on the Bristol Channel, near the Hinkley Point nuclear power stations.

== History ==
It was recorded as Lytel-Stoke or Lulestock in the Domesday Book, and rendered at one time as Little Stock or Little-stoke. Its name is said to have meant "the stoc [farm] of Lylla and his people".

Lilstock was an ancient parish, part of the Williton and Freemanners Hundred.

In 1811 210 acres (0.85 km^{2}) of common land were enclosed as part of the Inclosure Acts.

Lilstock became a civil parish in 1866, but on 25 March 1886 it was merged with Kilton to form the civil parish of Kilton with Lilstock, itself abolished in 1933 and absorbed into the parish of Stringston. In 1881 the parish had a population of 94.

From 1974 to 2019 it was in the West Somerset district, from 2019 to 2023 it was in the Somerset West and Taunton district.

== Coast ==
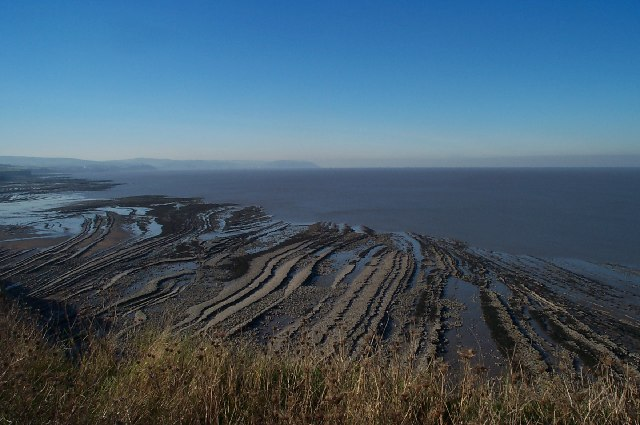
Wave-cut ridges on the beach

The Blue Anchor to Lilstock Coast Site of Special Scientific Interest (SSSI) provides an outstanding series of sections through the Early Jurassic Lower Lias, spanning the Hettangian and Pliensbachian stages and named the "Lilstock Formation". This sequence and the good Rhaetian succession beneath are repeatedly affected by faulting, making it of interest to geologists and fossil hunters. It also displays coastal geomorphology which demonstrates a particularly well-developed series of intertidal shore platforms varying in width from about 200–600 m. The cliff and beach are rich in reptile remains, including complete skeletons. Lilstock also yields ammonites, shells and fish remains. A unique specimen of an ichthyosaur, named Excalibosaurus costini MacGowan, in which the lower jaw is shorter than the upper, was found in the Lower Jurassic Sinemurian Stage, Lower Lias beds on the foreshore at Lilstock and is now in the Bristol City Museum and Art Gallery. The first known specimen of Ichthyotitan, the "Lilstock specimen", was also discovered there.

== Harbour ==
Lilstock appears to have been the old port of the Saxon settlement of Stogursey.

The Acland baronets were the lords of the manor. Around 1820 Sir John Acland built a boat house on the beach with a pier and breakwater to form Lilstock harbour. Coal was brought from Wales for domestic use on the Acland estate, and to fire the large limekiln on the cliff. Pit props were the main export along with lime. By 1848 there were resident coastguards, and by 1855 a customs officer. About 1860 a stone pier was built from the north side of the harbour wall. By 1866 warehouses were standing beneath the cliff beside the southern harbour wall. The limestone carrier the Richard was wrecked at Lilstock in 1881. A plan for a ship canal from Seaton in Devon to terminate at Lilstock was considered by the Board of Admiralty in 1888. The harbour was apparently abandoned following damage during a storm on the night of 28/29 December 1900, and the pier finally being destroyed after the First World War.

== Gunnery range ==
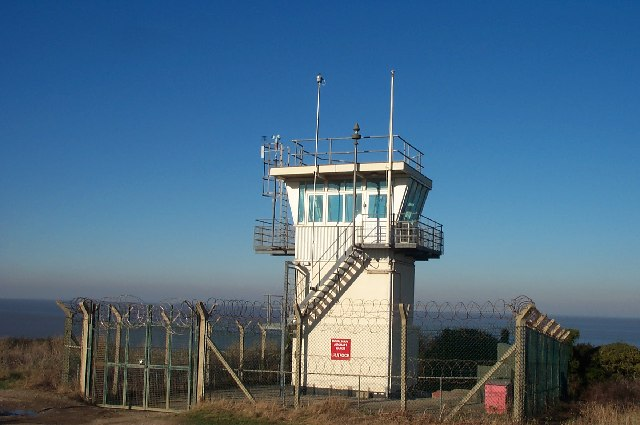
Royal Navy Aircraft Range, Lilstock. It is used as a lookout during gunnery practice over the sea.

The sea off Lilstock has been used as an air gunnery practice range connected to RNAS Yeovilton, and ordinance presumed to date to the Second World War has been found offshore. Lilstock Royal Navy Range served as a practice bombing range for fixed-wing aircraft using inert ordnance until 1995, when it was redesignated as a helicopter gunnery range.

== Church ==
The small Church of St Andrew, with only two rows of pews, features a 14th-century chancel arch. This arch is the only remaining portion of the earlier church which was demolished in 1881 when the present structure was erected. The church was declared redundant in 1980, and the Norman font removed to Stogursey Church in 1981. The church was restored around 1993 but only holds one service a year. The most recent baptism in the church was in 1881 and the most recent wedding was in 1834.
