= Watchet Boat Museum =

Maritime museum in Watchet, England

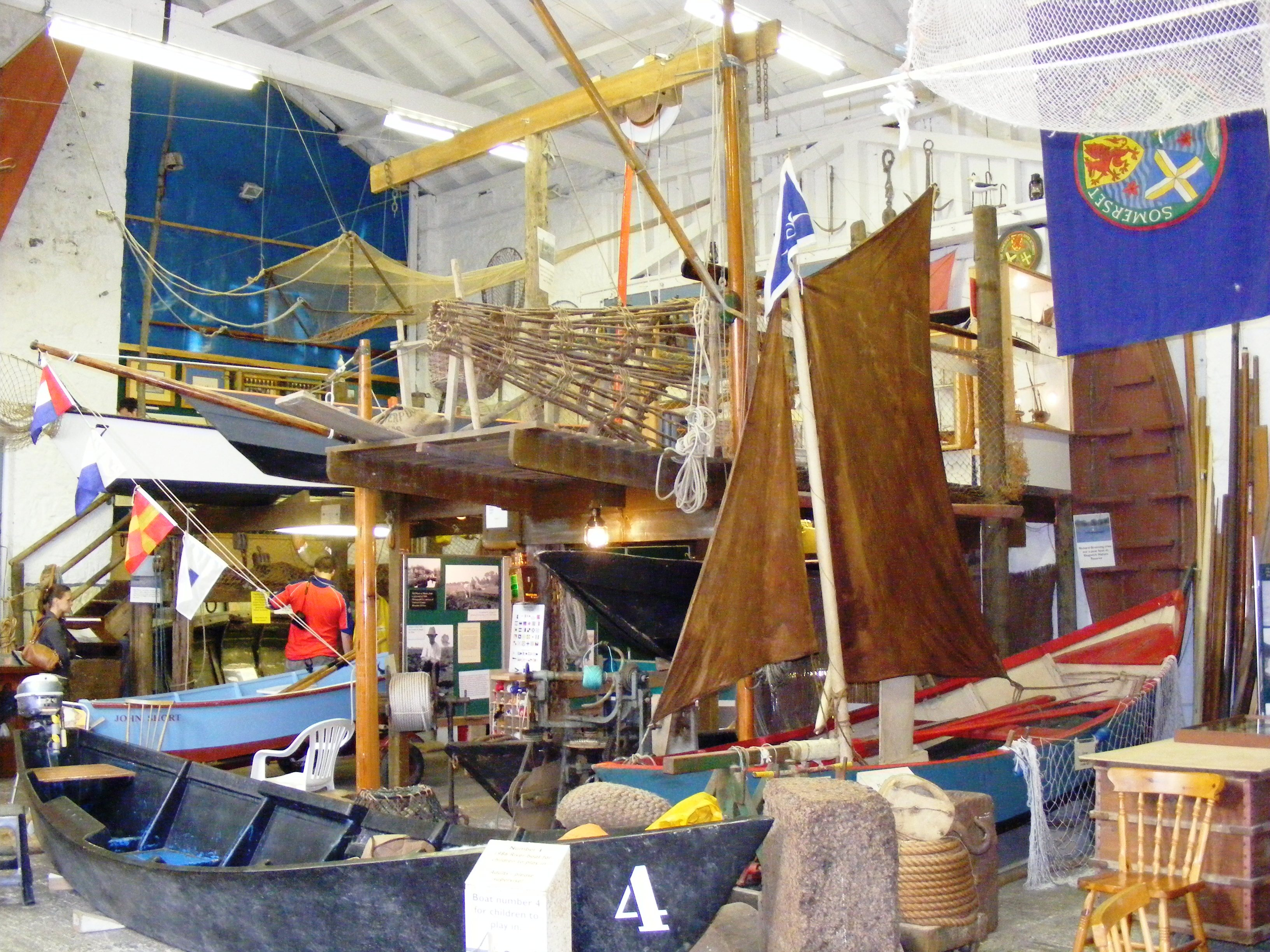

- Location within Somerset and the United Kingdom
- Location: Watchet, Somerset
- Coordinates: 51.1795°N 3.3242°W
- Curator: John Nash
- Website: Official website

Watchet Boat Museum is a small museum in Watchet, Somerset, England.

It is housed in the 1862, Victorian, former railway goods shed of Watchet railway station, which is today located on the heritage West Somerset Railway.

The exhibits include several types of boats found locally and associated artefacts, photographs and charts, plus nets and other items associated with their use. There are displays of maps, knotwork and boards showing the various uses of withy. There is also an example of a mudhorse which is a wooden sledge, propelled across the mudflats to collect fish from nets.

The museum specialises in the shallow draft Flatner, a form of vessel once prevalent in Bridgwater Bay and adjacent coastal areas. Flatners are small double-ended boats with no keel.

Withy Boats and Turf Boats, which were between 16 feet (4.9 m) and 20 feet (6.1 m) long, were used on the Somerset Levels to carry peat and withies to market. They were built from elm boards or clinker and were pulled along the banks of the drainage ditches on the levels.

River boats had a similar construction, but the bottom was curved to allow them to be launched down sloping muddy banks of rivers including the River Parrett, where they were used for salmon fishing.

Slightly larger boats, known as Bay or Gore Boats, have also been fitted with a simple sprit- or jib-headed sail, long rudder and dagger board for fishing use in inland waters.

== Gallery ==
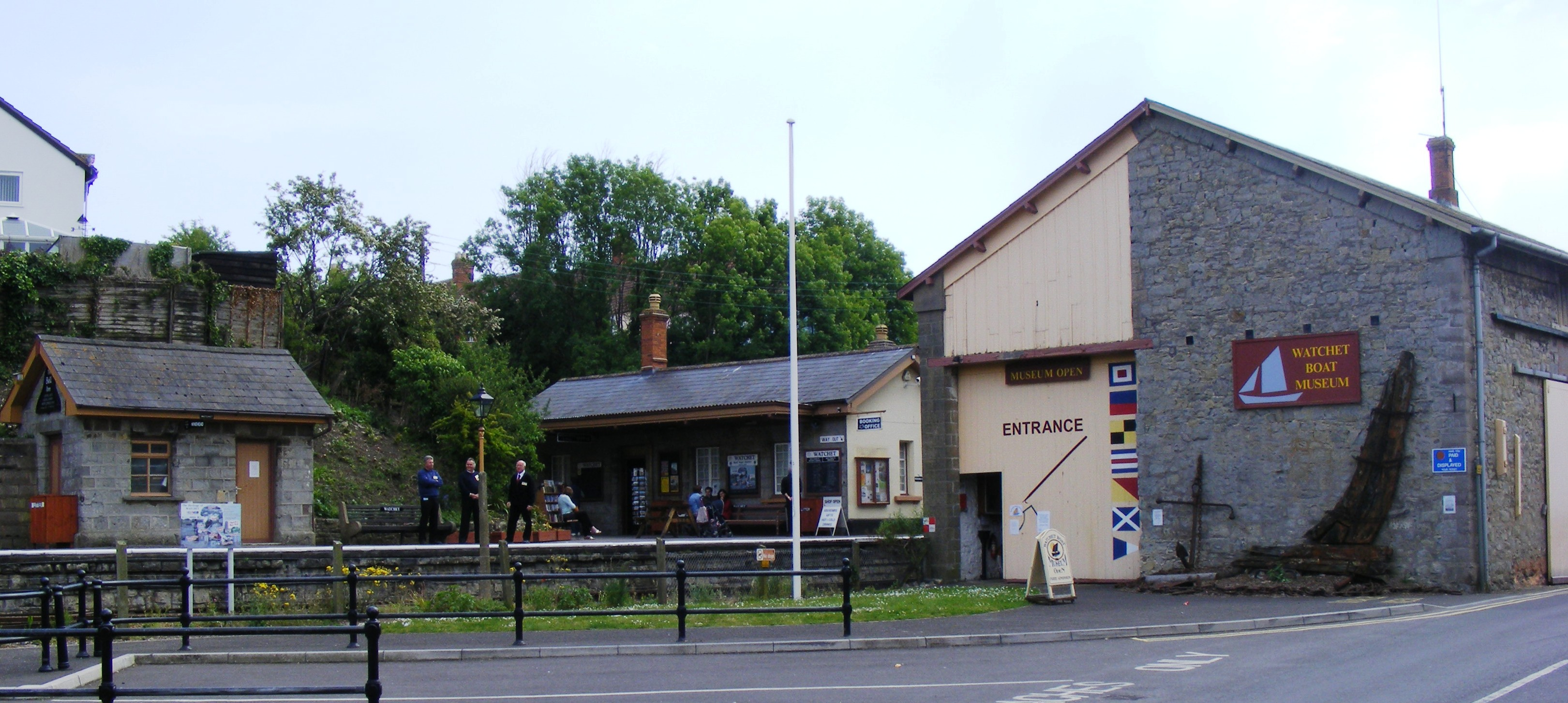
The Boat Museum and Station

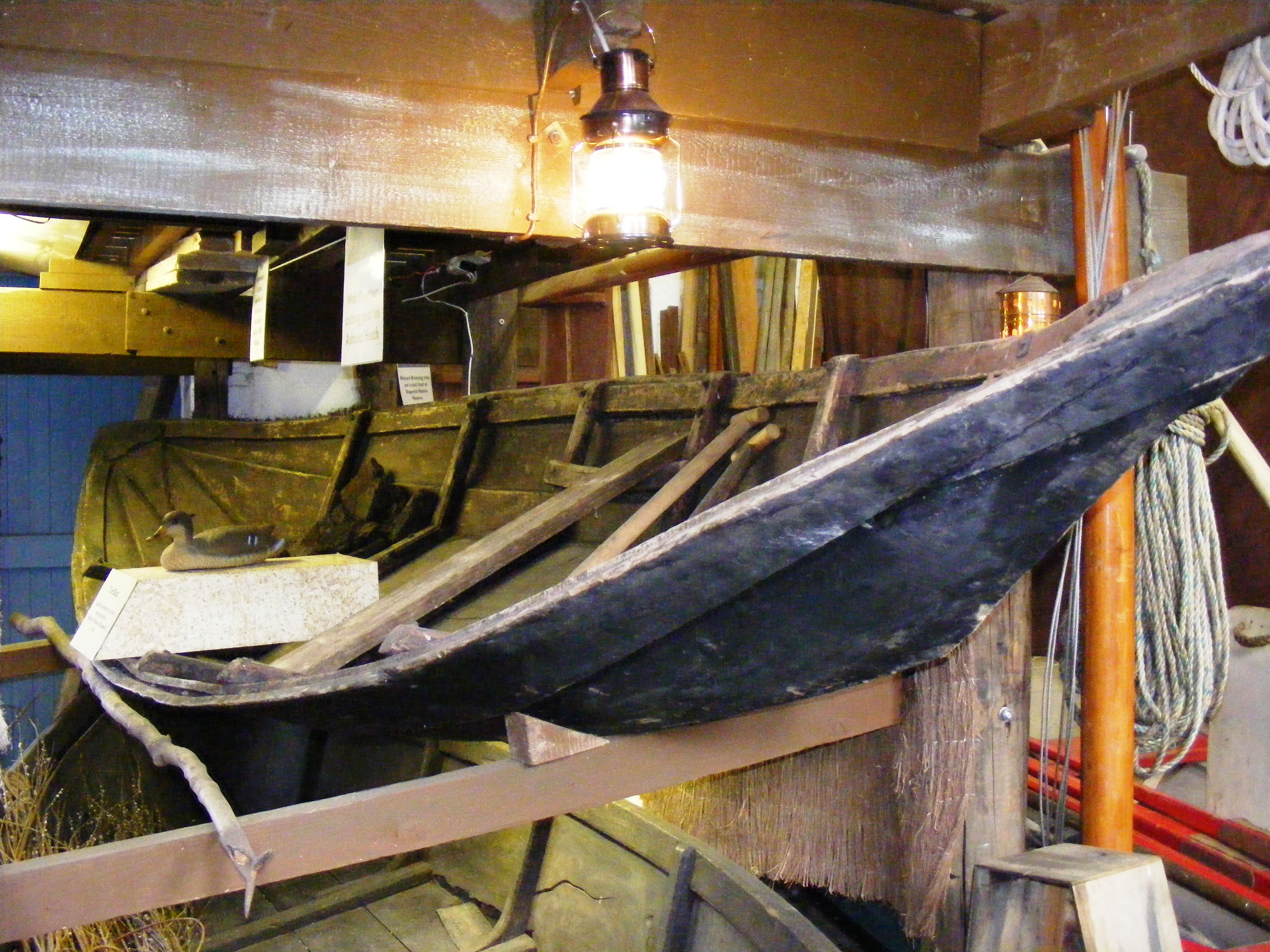
Flatner Turf Boat
