= Stockland Bristol =

Village in Somerset, England

Coordinates: 51.187°N 3.084°W

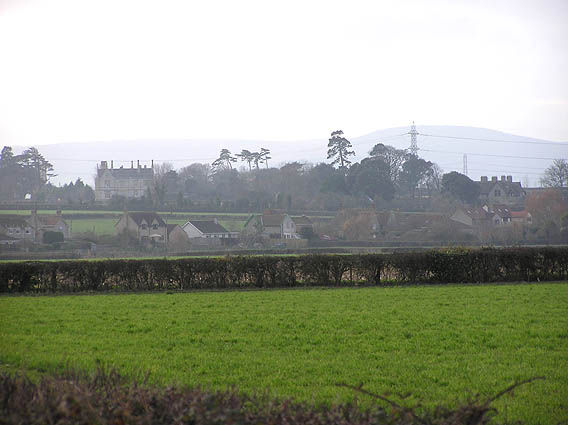
- Stockland Bristol from the east

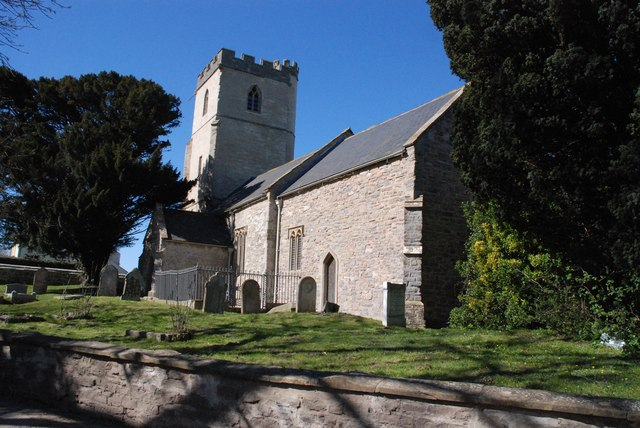
- St. Mary Magdalene

- Location within Somerset
- Population: 165 (2011)
- OS grid reference: ST243436
- Unitary authority: Somerset Council
- Ceremonial county: Somerset
- Region: South West
- Country: England
- Sovereign state: United Kingdom
- Post town: BRIDGWATER
- Postcode district: TA5
- Dialling code: 01278
- Police: Avon and Somerset
- Fire: Devon and Somerset
- Ambulance: South Western
- UK Parliament: Bridgwater

Stockland Bristol (formerly Stockland Gaunts) is a village and civil parish in Somerset, England, between Bridgwater and the Steart Peninsula.

== History ==
It was recorded in the Domesday Book as Stocheland meaning 'A stockade with land' from the Old English stoc and land. The name Bristol was added later from its medieval owner, Bristol Corporation.

Stockland Bristol was part of the hundred of Cannington. In the early 13th century the manor of Stockland was held by Maurice de Gaunt (d.1230), who left it in his will to St Mark's Hospital, Bristol, later known as Gaunts Hospital. In 1541 the manor was granted to Bristol Corporation, which held it until 1839.

The village lies on Combwich Reach as the River Parrett flows to the sea. The Steart peninsula has flooded many times during the last millennium. The most severe recent floods occurred in 1981. By 1997, a combination of coastal erosion, sea level rise and wave action had made some of the defences distinctly fragile and at risk from failure. As a result, in 2002 the Environment Agency produced the Stolford to Combwich Coastal Defence Strategy Study to examine options for the future.

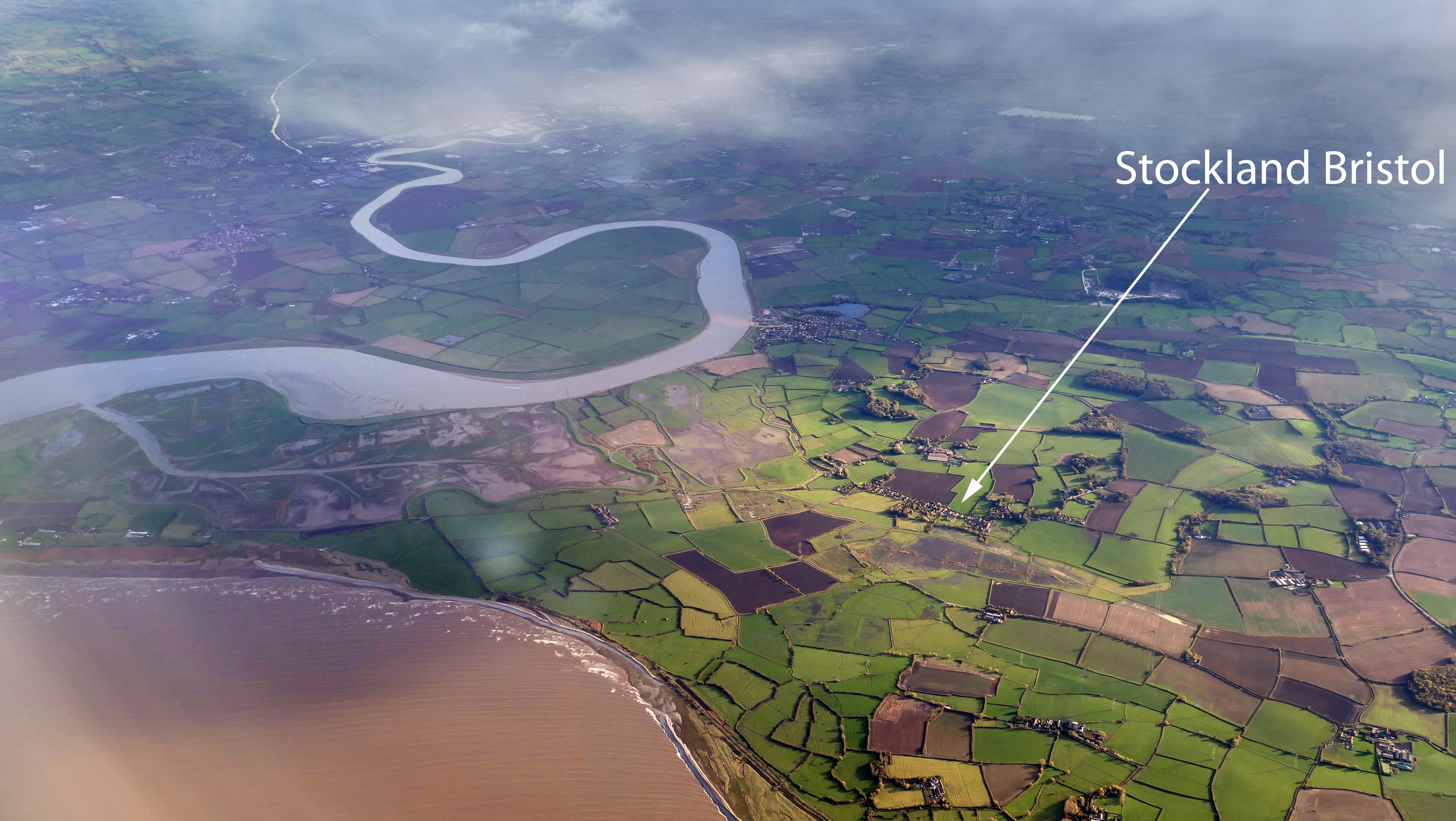
View of Stockland Bristol, the River Parrett, the Steart Peninsula and Bridgwater Bay

In the early part of World War II Stockland Bristol was chosen by the Radio Security Service (RSS) as the site for two wireless Direction Finding (D/F) stations known as Y-stations. They were located in the fields alongside Steart Road. These installations would have been used to locate the source of enemy radio transmissions. They were demolished after 1945.

== Governance ==
The parish council has responsibility for local issues, including setting an annual precept (local rate) to cover the council's operating costs and producing annual accounts for public scrutiny. The parish council evaluates local planning applications and works with the local police, district council officers, and neighbourhood watch groups on matters of crime, security, and traffic. The parish council's role also includes initiating projects for the maintenance and repair of parish facilities, as well as consulting with the district council on the maintenance, repair, and improvement of highways, drainage, footpaths, public transport, and street cleaning. Conservation matters (including trees and listed buildings) and environmental issues are also the responsibility of the council.

For local government purposes, since 1 April 2023, the village comes under the unitary authority of Somerset Council. Prior to this, it was part of the non-metropolitan district of Sedgemoor, which was formed on 1 April 1974 under the Local Government Act 1972, having previously been part of Bridgwater Rural District.

It is also part of the Bridgwater county constituency represented in the House of Commons of the Parliament of the United Kingdom. It elects one Member of Parliament (MP) by the first past the post system of election.

== Religious sites ==
The original church was demolished in 1865 with only the font and chancel screen preserved in the new church.
