= Stert Island =

Island off England

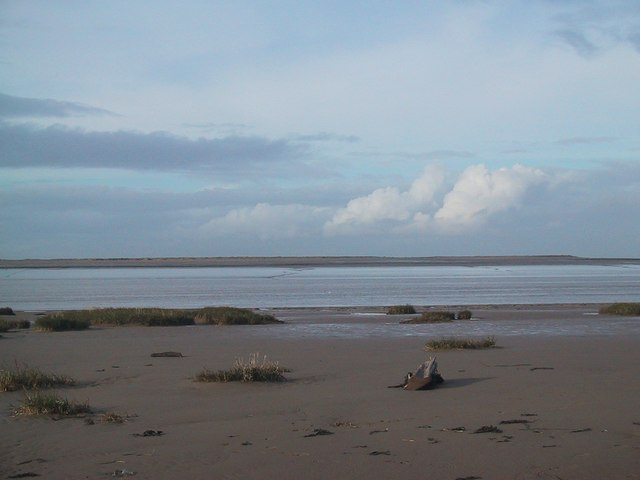
- Stert Island on the horizon as seen from Burnham-on-Sea, Somerset

- Location within England

Geography
- Location: Bridgwater Bay
- Coordinates: 51.2263°N 3.0156°W
- Adjacent to: Bristol Channel, River Parrett

Administration
- England
- County: Somerset

Demographics
- Population: 0

Stert Island is a low-lying uninhabited island in the Bristol Channel, off the coast of Somerset, England. It lies opposite Burnham-on-Sea, and is part of the Bridgwater Bay Nature Reserve.

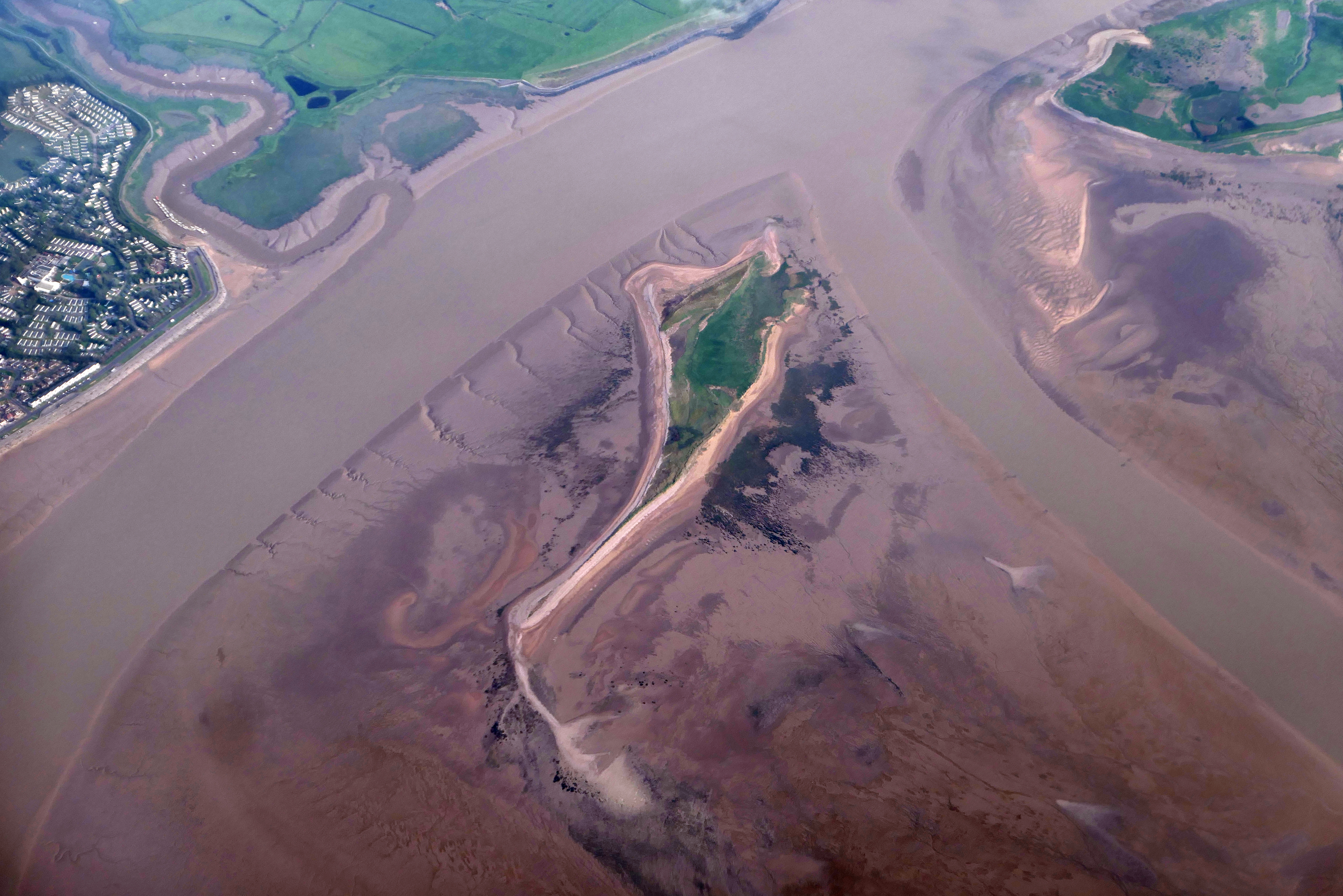
Aerial view of the island, with part of Burnham-on-Sea on the left.

Stert Island was formed in about 1798, when it broke off from the Steart Peninsula. The island is noted for its birds, including spotted redshank and whimbrel, which have a major night roost on the island.

Each year, a 2.4 km (1.5 mi) swim is organised from Burnham-on-Sea to the island.

Administratively the island is in the civil parish of Otterhampton. Until 1885 it was in the parish of Stogursey, and from then until 1933 it was in the parish of Huntspill.
