= River Parrett Trail =

Long-distance footpath in Dorset and Somerset, England

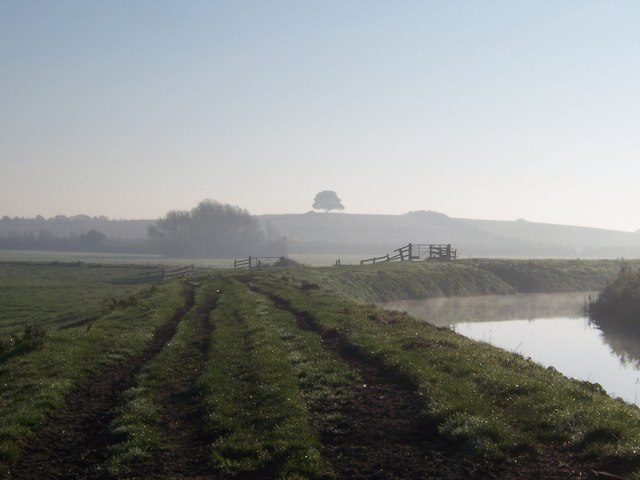
- View toward Burrow Hill from the River Parrett Trail on a misty morning
- Length: 47 mi (76 km)
- Location: Dorset & Somerset
- Trailheads: Chedington/Bridgwater Bay
- Use: Hiking

The River Parrett Trail is a long-distance footpath that can be used for walking, jogging, or running, following the route of the River Parrett in Somerset, England. The trail, which is 50 miles (80 km) long, runs from Chedington in Dorset to the mouth of the river in Bridgwater Bay where it joins the West Somerset Coast Path.

It passes many landmarks and places of interest including; Burrow Hill Cider Farm, Muchelney Abbey, West Sedgemoor (a Site of Special Scientific Interest (SSSI), the Blake Museum, Westonzoyland Pumping Station Museum, the site of the Battle of Sedgemoor and finally discharging into Bridgwater Bay (another SSSI).

The trail is managed by The Parrett Trail Partnership, a consortium of agencies including: Arts Council England, South West, British Waterways, Cannington Agricultural College, Country Land and Business Association, Natural England, Environment Agency, National Farmers Union, Royal Society for the Protection of Birds, Somerset Council, Somerset Wildlife Trust, South West Tourism, Take Art!, and Dorset Council.

== Route and points of interest ==
The following table lists key points of interest along the river.

Point	Coordinates (Links to map resources)	OS Grid Ref	Notes
Source	50.847°N 2.733°W	ST484055	near Chedington
A303 bridge	50.947°N 2.783°W	ST450167	South Petherton
River Isle confluence	51.009°N 2.832°W	ST416237	
River Yeo confluence	51.032°N 2.822°W	ST424262	
Bow Bridge	51.036°N 2.835°W	ST415266	Langport
Monk's Leaze Clyce	51.048°N 2.844°W	ST408280	Regulates flow into Sowy River
River Tone confluence	51.067°N 2.917°W	ST357302	Located at Burrowbridge
Westonzoyland Pumping Station Museum	51.091°N 2.944°W	ST339328	
Town Bridge	51.129°N 3.001°W	ST300372	Bridgwater
Drove Bridge	51.138°N 3.001°W	ST300382	Most seaward and newest road bridge on river
Dunball Wharf	51.162°N 2.989°W	ST309408	
Mouth	51.229°N 3.009°W	ST296482	

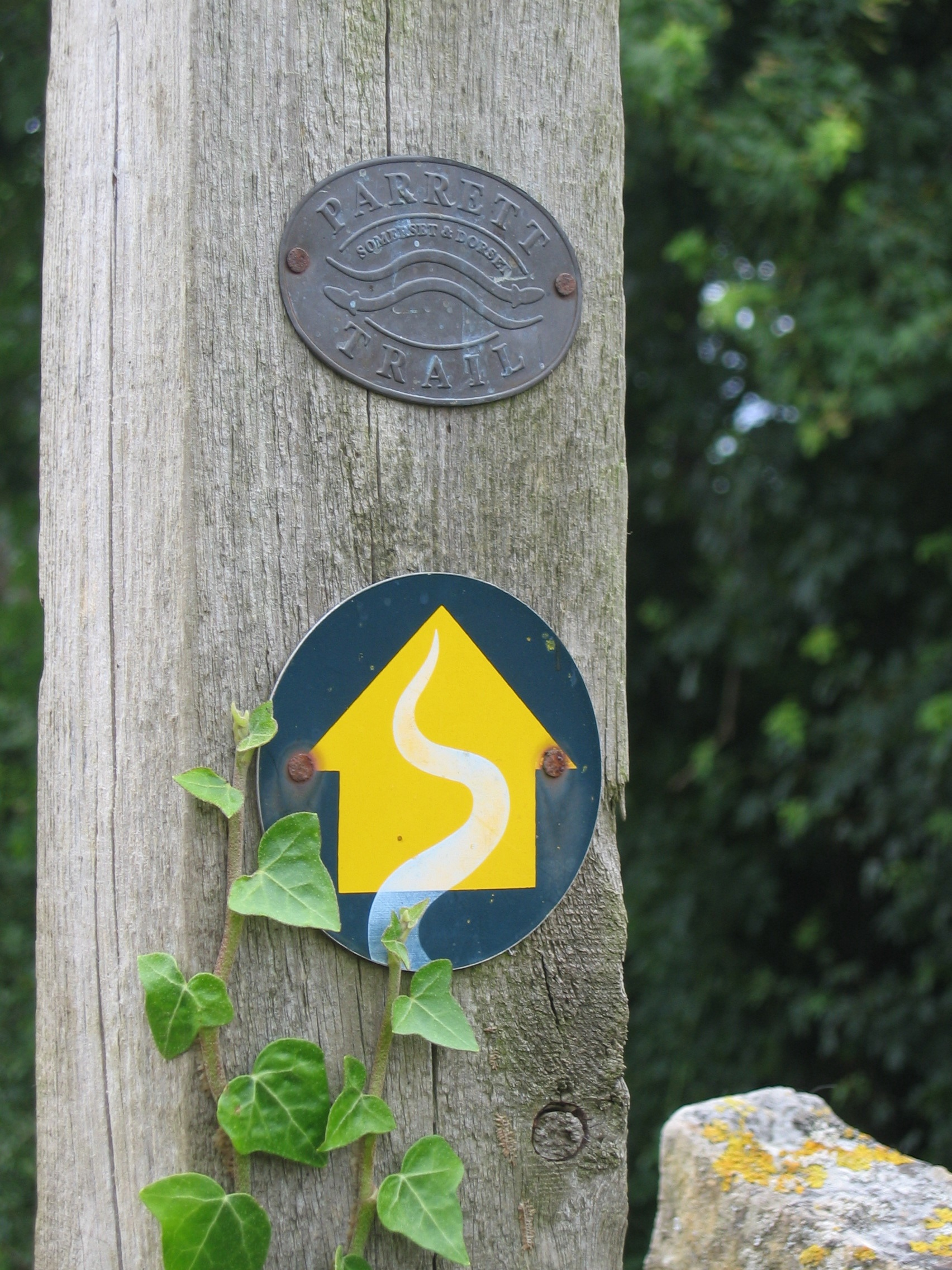
Trail marker on the River Parrett Trail

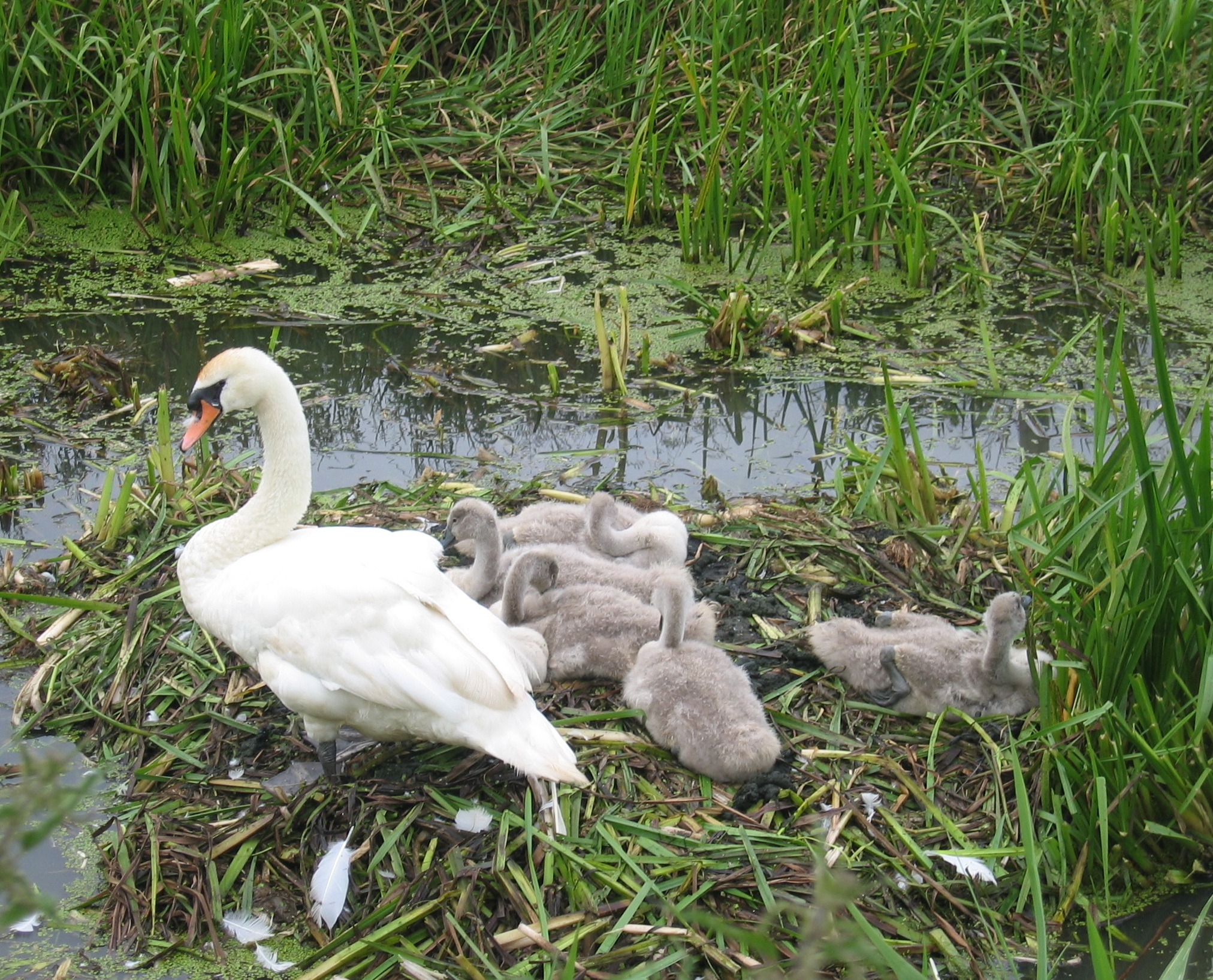
Family of mute swans nesting by the River Parrett Trail near Langport

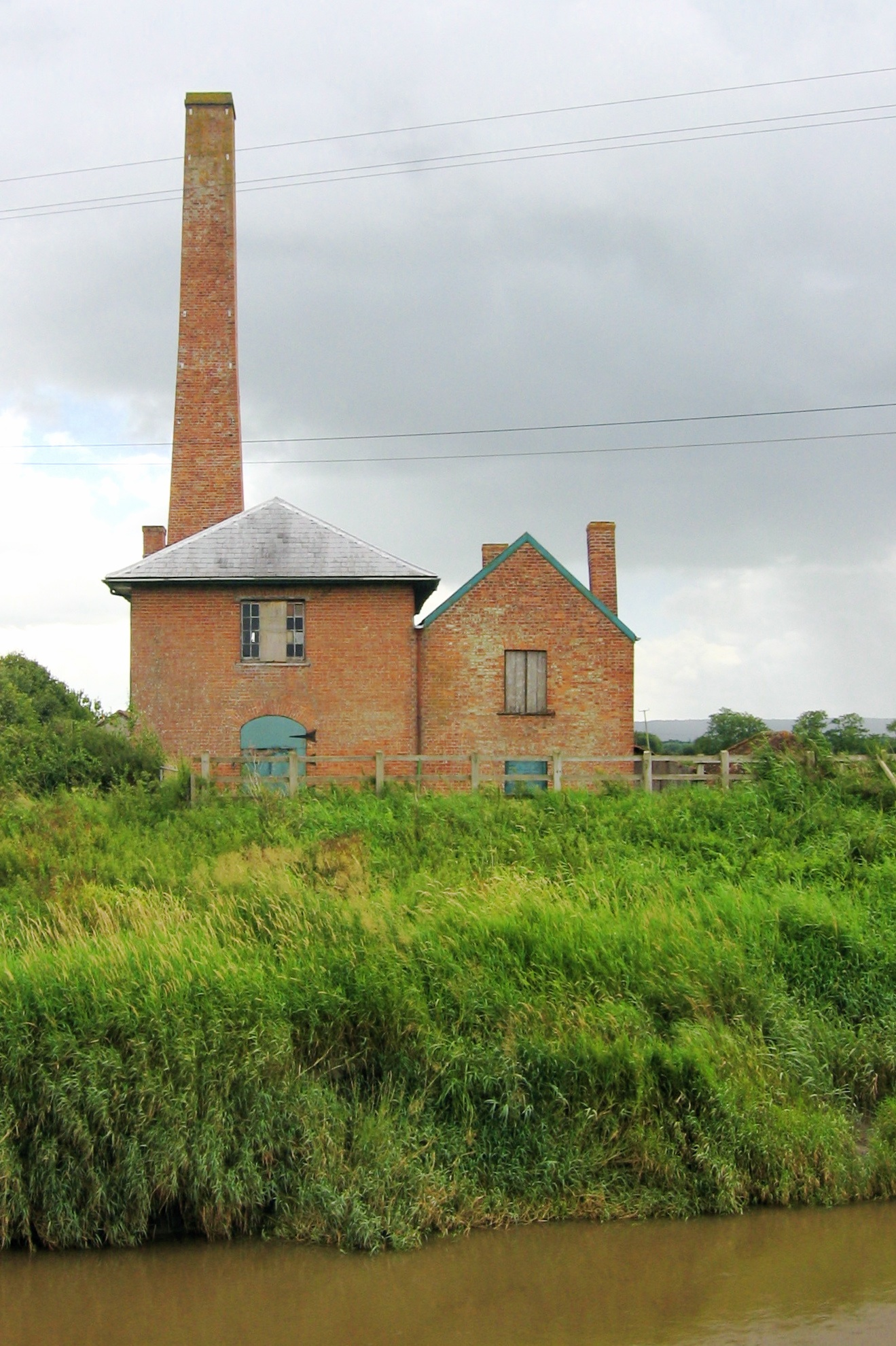
Westonzoyland Pumping Station, viewed from the River Parrett Trail

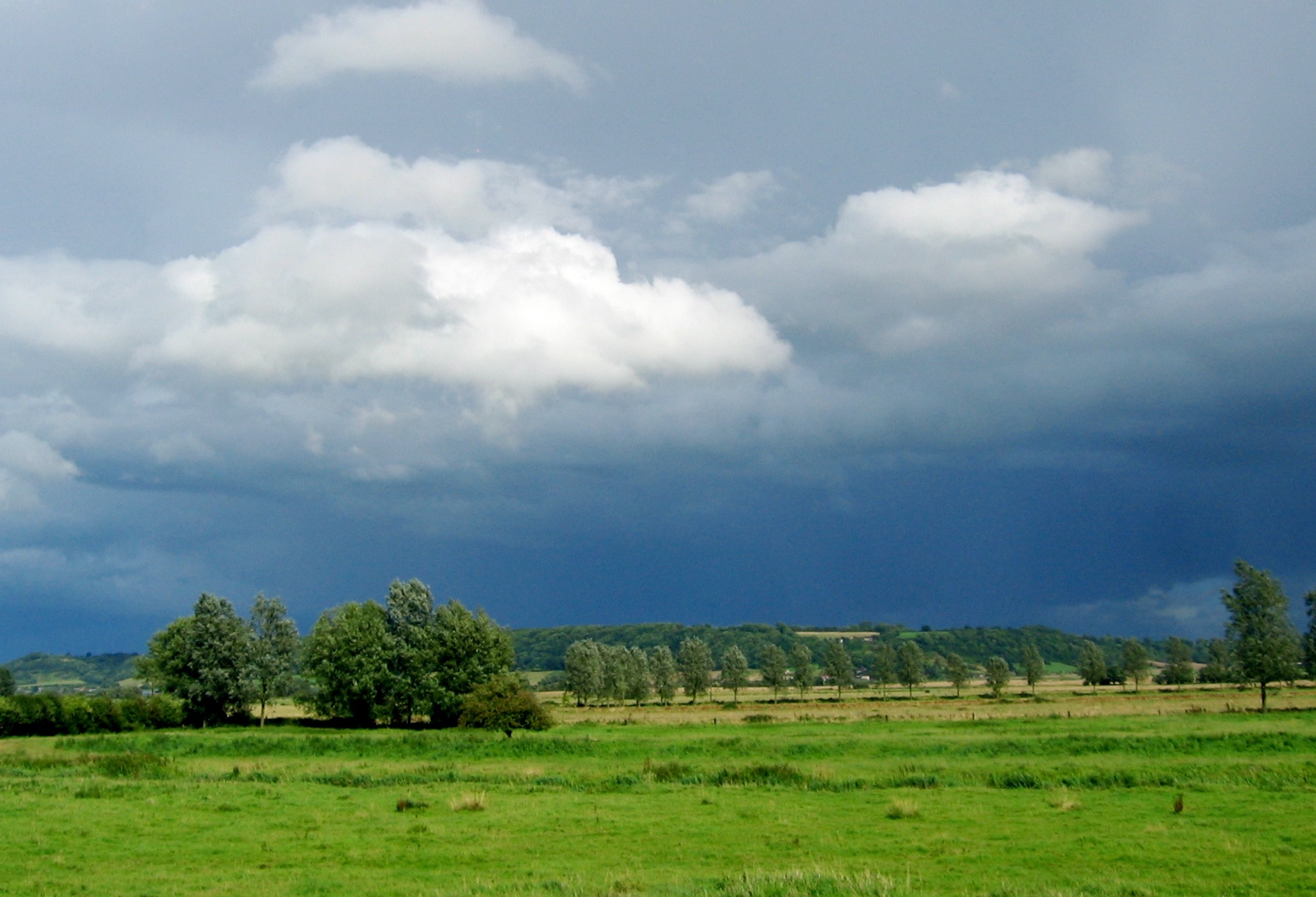
View of the Somerset Levels from the River Parrett Trail

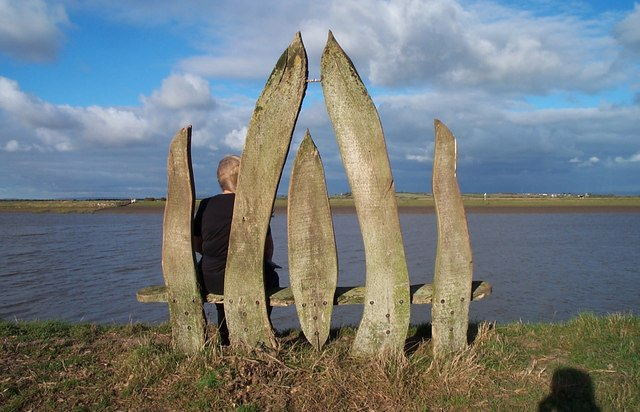
Seat, made in 1996, on the west bank of the Parrett Estuary, a mile from the village of Combwich
