= Blue Anchor to Lilstock Coast SSSI =

Protected area in Somerset, England

Blue Anchor to Lilstock Coast
- Site of Special Scientific Interest
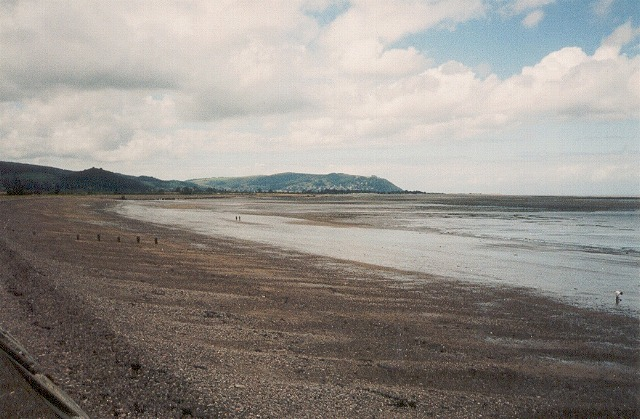

- Location within Somerset
- Location of Blue Anchor to Lilstock Coast.
- Area of search: Somerset
- Grid reference: ST033435
- Coordinates: 51.1810°N 3.3993°W
- Interest: Geological
- Area: 742.8 hectares (7.428 km^{2}; 2.868 sq mi)
- Notification date: 1971

Blue Anchor to Lilstock Coast SSSI (grid reference ST033435 to grid reference ST195462) is a 742.8 hectare geological Site of Special Scientific Interest between Blue Anchor and Lilstock in Somerset, notified in 1971.

It provides an outstanding series of sections through the Early Jurassic Lower Lias, spanning the Hettangian and Pliensbachian Stages and named the "Lilstock Formation". This sequence and the good Rhaetian succession beneath are repeatedly affected by faulting, making it of interest to geologists and fossil hunters. It also displays coastal geomorphology which demonstrates a particularly well-developed series of intertidal shore platforms varying in width from about 200-600m. The cliff and beach are rich in reptile remains, including complete skeletons. Lilstock also yields ammonites, shells and fish remains. A unique specimen of an ichthyosaur, named Excalibosaurus costini McGowan, 1986 in which the lower jaw is shorter than the upper was found in the Lower Jurassic Sinemurian Stage, Lower Lias beds on the foreshore at Lilstock and is now in the Bristol City Museum and Art Gallery.

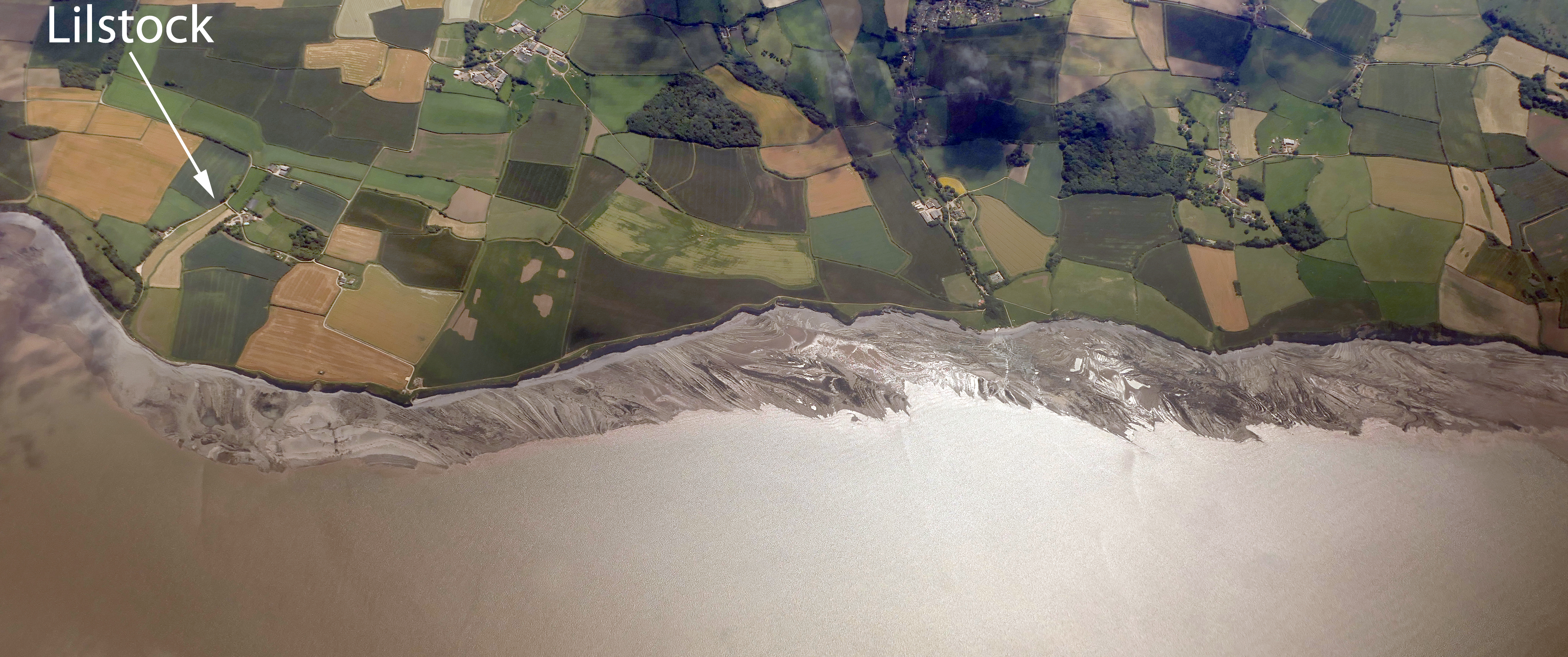
An aerial view of the eastern third of the SSSI.

The Triassic cliffs have geological interest for the variety of fossils. The coloured alabaster found in the cliffs gave rise to the name of the colour "Watchet Blue". It is on the West Somerset Coast Path.
