= Johannes Stert =

German conductor and composer

Johannes Stert (born 1963) is an internationally active German conductor and composer.

In 2009-2012, he has conducted Mozart’s Die Zauberflöte at the Korean National Theater in Seoul, Mozart’s Don Giovanni at Lisbon's Teatro Nacional de São Carlos (where he is a frequent guest) and several opera and symphony performances in Magdeburg, Germany. Praised by Vienna's paper Die Presse, he also made his debut at the Danish Royal Opera, Copenhagen Opera House, in December 2009, and will return there in 2011. He took the Teatro Nacional de São Carlos company on tour to China in early 2010, conducting operas and concerts in Macao, Hong Kong and Beijing.

From 2002 to 2006, he was Principal Guest Conductor at the Graz (Austria) Opera. From 1995 to 2004 he was First Conductor at the Cologne (Germany) Opera and conducted a large repertoire, specializing in Mozart. While in Graz, he conducted a controversial production of Wagner's Parsifal, and Hans Werner Henze's Boulevard Solitude. In 2006, he conducted György Ligeti's bizarre and difficult opera, Le Grand Macabre.

Stert is Music Director of the Orchesterverein Hilgen, and has conducted such orchestras as the Gürzenich Orchestra Cologne, the Staatsorchester Rheinische Philharmonie, the Cracow Radio Orchestra, the WDR-Radio Orchestra (Stuttgart) and the Ensemble Avantgarde. As both composer and conductor, his many contemporary music projects have enabled him to work closely with well-known composers, such as Karlheinz Stockhausen, John Cage, Manfred Trojahn, Johannes Fritsch and Detlev Glanert. This has led to engagements with such contemporary music groups as the ensemble recherche and the Ensemble Köln. Hans Werner Henze has singled out Johannes Stert for special praise. He is also active in the recording studio, with works such as Karl Goldmark's complete opera Merlin in 2007; and the recently rediscovered Friedrich von Flotow Piano Concerti 1 and 2, with the WDR Symphony Orchestra Cologne in 2009.

His works as a composer include "Ida, eine Traurige Humoreske" for winds; the "Engellieder," based on poems by Rilke, for soprano and orchestra (or piano); and the oratorio, "Aus der Stille," for soprano, solo clarinet, chorus, orchestra and two actors.

Johannes Stert lives in Stuttgart with his wife, German actress Beate Maria Schwarzbauer, and their two children.
