= Hinkley Point =

Headland on the Bristol Channel, England

Coordinates: 51°12′29″N 3°07′45″W

The headland at Hinkley Point with the power stations visible in the background

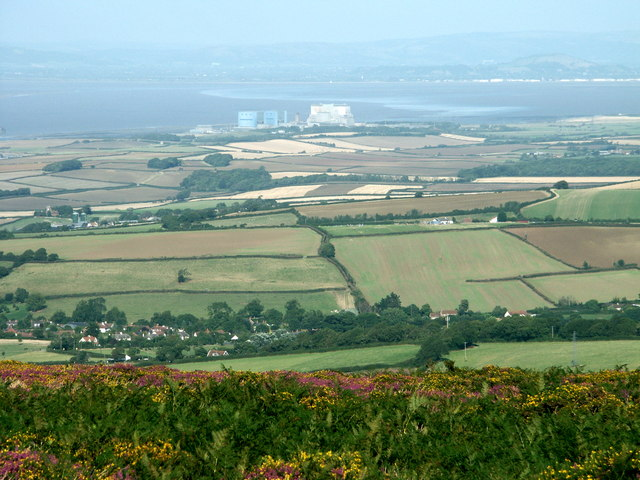
Hinkley Point from the Quantock Hills

Hinkley Point is a headland on the Bristol Channel coast of Somerset, England, 5 miles (8 kilometres) north of Bridgwater and 5 mi (8 km) west of Burnham-on-Sea, close to the mouth of the River Parrett.

Excavations in 2014 and 2015, carried out by Cotswold Archaeology and funded by Électricité de France (EDF) in preparation for the construction of the Hinkley Point C nuclear power station, discovered a farming settlement at the site dating from the Iron Age and then a post Roman cemetery.

Hinkley Point adjoins Bridgwater Bay, a Site of Special Scientific Interest and nature reserve, and is a popular location for birdwatching and fossil hunting. A visitor centre in Bridgwater gives access to information, as well as running tours of the plant. There is also a nature trail which features plants, birds, and butterflies.

The exposed location of Hinkley Point meant that it was considered ideal for wind generation. However, a proposal to build 12 wind turbines close to the site of the nuclear power stations was turned down in October 2005. The reason given by the West Somerset District Council for the rejection was safety fears over what would happen were a turbine blade to detach and hit "something or somebody".

== Nuclear power stations ==
The landscape of Hinkley Point is dominated by three nuclear power stations:

- Hinkley Point A, with two Magnox reactors (1965–2000)
- Hinkley Point B, with two Advanced gas-cooled reactors in one building (1976–2022)
- Hinkley Point C, with two European Pressurised Reactors (under construction since 2017)

In 2008, the Brown Government announced its support for a third nuclear power station at Hinkley Point. EDF Energy plan to build a power station consisting of two European Pressurised Reactor (EPR) units, called Hinkley Point C, subject to electricity pricing agreement with the government. HMG said in 2008 that the new Hinkley Point and Sizewell C power stations would contribute 13% of UK electricity in the early 2020s. While the initial constructor EDF was in critical financial trouble, contracts were signed to bring the China General Nuclear Power Group on board in September 2016. Hinkley Point C is projected to use three million tonnes of concrete and 230,000 tonnes of steel reinforcements. One of its claims to fame is that the project was as of 2020 "the most expensive nuclear power station in the world".
