= Blue Anchor =

Village in Somerset, England

Coordinates: 51.1810°N 3.3993°W

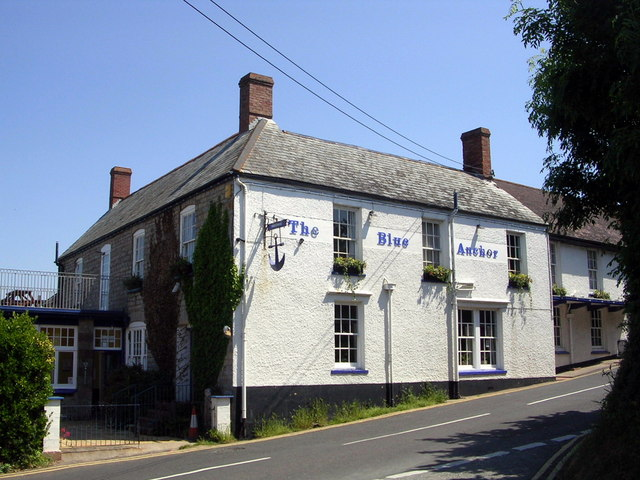
- The Pub

- Location within Somerset
- OS grid reference: ST022433
- Civil parish: Carhampton
- Unitary authority: Somerset
- Ceremonial county: Somerset
- Region: South West
- Country: England
- Sovereign state: United Kingdom
- Post town: MINEHEAD
- Postcode district: TA24
- Dialling code: 01984
- Police: Avon and Somerset
- Fire: Devon and Somerset
- Ambulance: South Western
- UK Parliament: Tiverton and Minehead

Blue Anchor is a seaside village, in the parish of Old Cleeve, close to Carhampton in Somerset, England. The village takes its name from a 17th-century inn; the bay, Blue Anchor Bay, was previously known as Cleeve Bay. The bay and inn were the subjects of a watercolour by J. M. W. Turner in 1818, now in the Lady Lever Gallery, Port Sunlight.

The village marks one end of the Blue Anchor to Lilstock Coast Site of Special Scientific Interest along which the Triassic cliffs have geological interest for the variety of fossils. The coloured alabaster found in the cliffs gave rise to the name of the colour "Watchet Blue".

The village lies on the route of the West Somerset Coast Path and Celtic Way Exmoor Option.

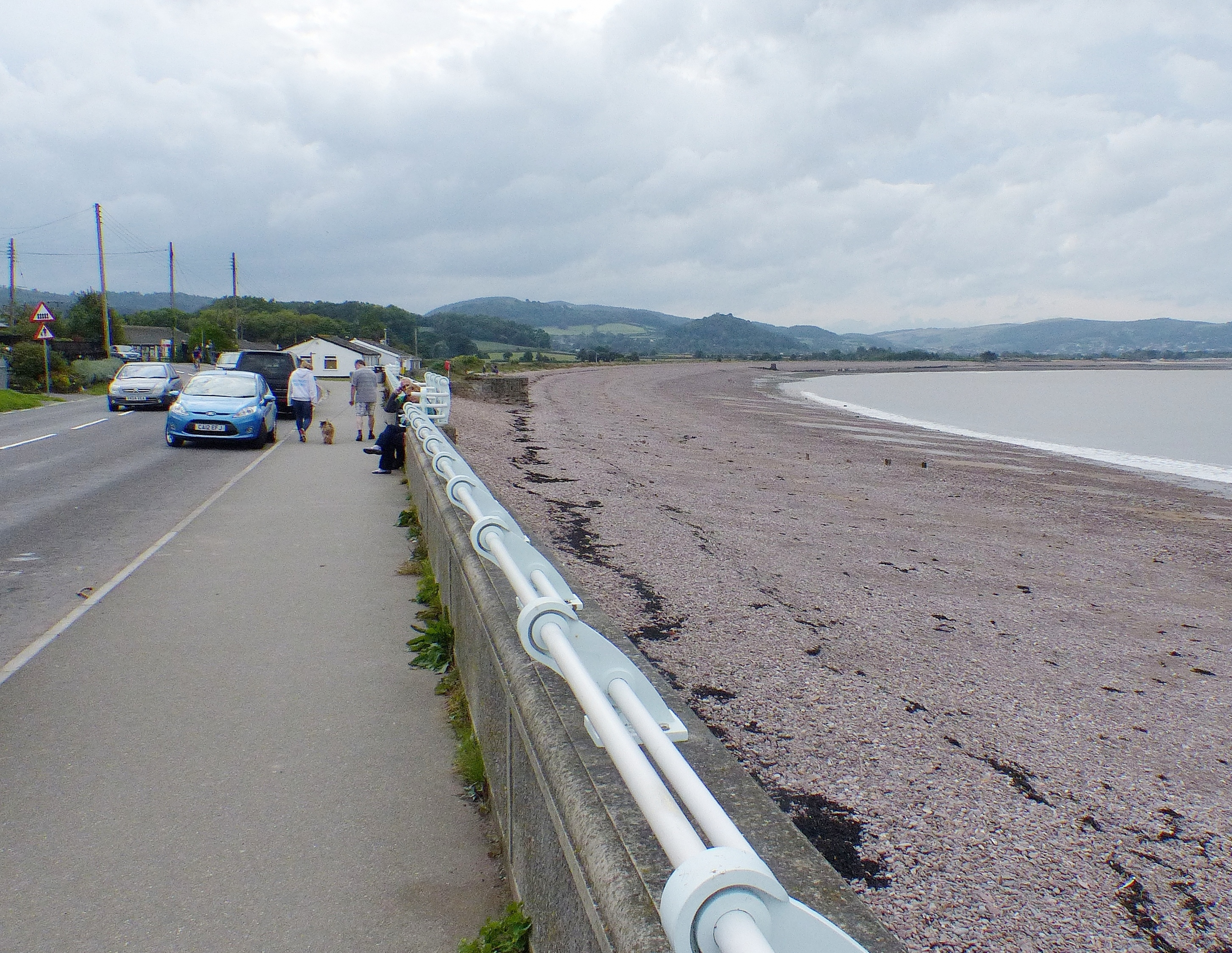
The beach, looking west towards Minehead and Dunster

Blue Anchor railway station is a station on the West Somerset Railway, a heritage railway in Somerset. It is situated in the village and houses the museum of the West Somerset Steam Railway Trust.

Within the village is the only example of an updraught brick kiln known to have survived in Somerset. It was built around 1830, supplied by small vessels carrying limestone to the small culm landing, and is now used as a garage. The kiln is thought to have been used until the 1870s when the large-scale production of bricks in Bridgwater rendered small brickyards uneconomic.

Marshwood farmhouse dates from the late 15th century and was originally a manor house or grange. It has been designated by English Heritage as a Grade II* listed building.

Coincidentally there is another Blue Anchor Inn directly north across the Bristol Channel in East Aberthaw, The Vale of Glamorgan.
