= Combwich =

Village in Somerset, England

Coordinates: 51.1768°N 3.0671°W

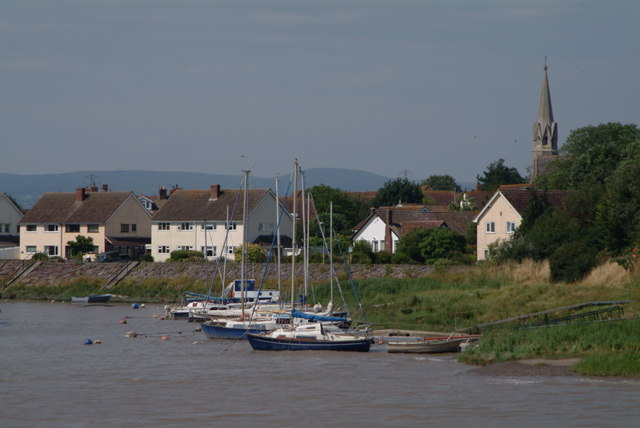
- Combwich Harbour

- Location within Somerset
- OS grid reference: ST258423
- Civil parish: Otterhampton
- Unitary authority: Somerset Council
- Ceremonial county: Somerset
- Region: South West
- Country: England
- Sovereign state: United Kingdom
- Post town: Bridgwater
- Postcode district: TA5
- Dialling code: 01278
- Police: Avon and Somerset
- Fire: Devon and Somerset
- Ambulance: South Western
- UK Parliament: Bridgwater

Combwich (/ˈkʌmɪdʒ/ KUM-ij) is a village in the parish of Otterhampton within the county of Somerset, between Bridgwater and the Steart Peninsula.

The village lies on Combwich Reach as the River Parrett flows to the sea and was the site of an ancient ferry crossing. In the Domesday Book it was known as Comiz which means 'The settlement at the short, broad, open valley' (from Old English cumb). This is clearly a reference to the valley of exactly this topographical description, immediately to the south of the village, and through which the South Moor Brook flows westwards into the River Parrett. One derivation of -wich is thought to be from Latin 'vicus', and there are archaeological indications that there was a settlement at Combwich in the Romano-British period, based around a ferry across the Parrett at this point. The exact meaning of the second element here is uncertain at present, as Old English -wic can have a variety of meanings attributed to it.

It served as a port for the export of local produce and the import of timber from the 15th century. It also served the local brick and coal yard until the creek silted up in the 1930s. Brick and tile making was first recorded in the village in 1842. As of 2019, Combwich wharf is being used for the delivery of large equipment for the building of Hinkley Point C nuclear power station.

The Steart Peninsula has flooded many times during the last millennium. The most severe recent floods occurred in 1981. By 1997, a combination of coastal erosion, sea level rise and wave action had made some of the defences distinctly fragile and at risk from failure. As a result, in 2002, The Environment Agency produced the Stolford to Combwich Coastal Defence Strategy Study to examine options for the future.
