= Charmouth Mudstone Formation =

Geological formation in England

- Stratigraphic range: Lower Sinemurian– Lower Pliensbachian Semicostatum-lowermost Margaritatus 198–188 Ma
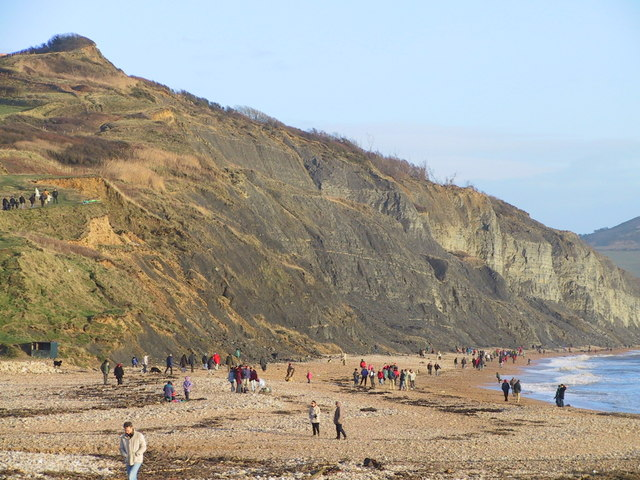
- Cliffs of the Charmouth Mudstone Formation at Charmouth, Dorset
- Type: Formation
- Unit of: Lias Group
- Sub-units: Shales With Beef Member, Black Ven Marl Member, Belemnite Marl Member, Green Ammonite Member
- Underlies: Dyrham Formation, Marlstone Rock Formation, unconformity with Gault (Charmouth area)
- Overlies: Blue Lias Formation, Scunthorpe Mudstone
- Area: Wessex Basin, Worcester Basin, East Midland Shelf
- Thickness: ~335 m

Lithology
- Primary: Shale, mudstone
- Other: Limestone, sandstone

Location
- Region: England
- Country: United Kingdom

Type section
- Named for: Charmouth
- Location: Cliff and foreshore exposures between Seven Rock Point and Golden Cap, Dorset

The Charmouth Mudstone Formation is a geological formation in England, dating to the Early Jurassic (Sinemurian–Pliensbachian). It forms part of the lower Lias Group. It is most prominently exposed at its type locality in cliff section between Lyme Regis and Charmouth (alongside the underlying Blue Lias) but onshore it extends northwards to Market Weighton, Yorkshire, and in the subsurface of the East Midlands Shelf and Wessex Basin. The formation is notable for its fossils, including those of ammonites and marine reptiles and rare dinosaur remains. The formation played a prominent role in the history of early paleontology, with its Lyme Regis-Charmouth exposure being frequented by fossil collectors including Mary Anning.

== Stratigraphy ==
=== Shales With Beef Member ===
The Shales With Beef Member is around 28–30 metres thick in the Lyme Regis-Charmouth region and predominantly consists of thinly bedded medium to dark grey mudstone, blocky calcareous pale-weathering mudstone and brown-grey organic-rich mudstones with frequent bedding parallel veins of fibrous calcite ("beef"), that are usually less than 10 centimetres thick. Several beds of nodular and tabular limestone are also present. It is the lowest unit of the formation and directly overlies the Blue Lias Formation, with the boundary being marked by a prominent bioturbated horizon. Notable persistent marker beds within the member include the laminated calcareous siltstone "Fish Bed", "Table Ledge", which consists of lens beds of limestones with mud content with nests of rhynchonellid brachiopods, the Devonshire Head and the Spittles limestones and the Birchi Nodules (which are septarian concretions) The upper boundary with the Black Ven Marl Member is marked by the prominent laterally persistent limestone Birchi Tabular Bed.

=== Black Ven Marl Member ===
The Black Ven Marl Member is around 43 metres thick consists of thinly bedded dark mudstones, with several laterally persistent cementstone horizons, notable horizons include the Lower and Upper Cement beds and the Stellare nodules.

=== Belemnite Marl Member ===
The Belemnite Marl Member is around 20 to 27 metres thick, and consists of interbedded pale and dark grey calcareous mudstone, with numerous belemnites, hence the name. The top of the member is marked by the Belemnite Stone Bed

=== Green Ammonite Member ===
The Green Ammonite Member is up to 31 metres thick predominantly consists of medium grey mudstones, with 3 limestone horizons, Lower Limestone; Red Band, and Upper Limestone, it is conformably overlain by the Dyrham Formation in some areas, but in the Charmouth area there is an erosive unconformable boundary with the much younger Early Cretaceous (Albian) aged Gault clays.

== Paleobiota ==
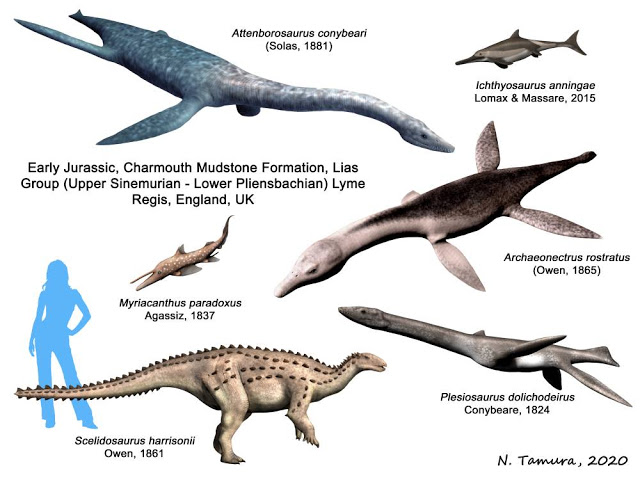
Vertebrate fauna of the Charmouth Mudstone Formation

=== Ammonites ===
Ammonites of the Charmouth Mudstone Formation
Genus	Species	Location	Stratigraphic position	Material	Notes	Images
Apoderoceras	A. cf. dunrobinense, A. subtriangulare					
Arnioceras	A. semicostatum		Semicostatum Zone			
Asteroceras	A. obtusum		Obtusum zone			
Caenisites						
Cymbites						
Echioceras	E. raricostatum		Raricostatum Zone			
Eoderoceras	E. bispinigerum					
Gemmellaroceras	G. cf. peregrinum		Belemnite Marls			
Oxynoticeras	O. williamsi					
Phricodoceras	P. taylori, P. lamellosum		Belemnite Marls			
Promicroceras	P. planicosta		Obtusum Zone			
Radstockiceras	R. complicatum					
Tragophylloceras	T. ibex, T. loscombi		Green Ammonite Member			
Uptonia	U. bronni					
Xipheroceras						

=== Sauropterygia ===
Sauropterygia of the Charmouth Mudstone Formation
Genus	Species	Location	Stratigraphic position	Material	Notes	Images
Archaeonectrus	A. rostratus	Charmouth	Arnioceras semicostatum-Echioceras raricostatum ammonoid zone	BMNH 38525 (holotype skeleton)	A marine sauropterygian, member of the family Rhomaleosauridae	Archaeonectrus
Attenborosaurus	A. conybeari	Black Ven Water, Charmouth; Northwest corner of Black Ven Water	Asteroceras obtusum, Arnioceras semicostatum-Echioceras raricostatum ammonoid zones	Holotype skeleton (now destroyed); BMNH 40140, partial skeleton and skull	A marine sauropterygian, early member of the family Pliosauridae. It was first identified as Plesiosaurus conybeari.	Attenborosaurus
Plesiosaurus	P. dolichodeirus	Lyme Regis	Echioceras raricostatum ammonoid zone	Holotype (BMNH 22656); Numerous specimens referred	A marine sauropterygian, type member of the family Plesiosauroidea inside Plesiosauria.	Plesiosaurus
Plesiosaurus	?P. sp.	Eastern point of Wear Cliffs, below Golden Cap	Prodactylioceras davoei ammonoid zone	BRSMG Ce17972a-o, articulated juvenile partial postcranial skeleton	A juvenile specimen that resembles those assigned to the genus Plesiosaurus.	
Thaumatodracon	T. wiedenrothi	Between Lyme Regis and Charmouth	Black Ven	NLMH 106.058, "a partial skeleton comprising a complete cranium, mandible, articulated cervical series, and indeterminate fragmentary remains"	A rhomaleosaurid	Thaumatodracon

=== Ichthyosauria ===
Ichthyosauria of the Charmouth Mudstone Formation
Genus	Species	Location	Stratigraphic position	Material	Notes	Images
Ichthyosaurus	I. anningae	Charmouth	Stonebarrow Marls Member	DONMG:1983.98 Subadult specimen	An ichthyosaurid ichthyosaur	Ichthyosaurus anningae
Ichthyosaurus	I. sp.	West of Westhay Water, Stonebarrow	Stonebarrow Marls Member	NHMUK R15907, partial skeleton	Considered to belong to I. communis by Bennett et al. 2012, considered indeterminate within Ichthyosaurus by Lomax and Massare 2015	
Leptonectes	L. moorei	Seatown	Belemnite Marls Member	BMNH R14370 partial anterior skeleton with most complete skull	A leptonectid ichthyosaur	Leptonectes
Leptonectes	L. solei	Seatown	Acanthopleuroceras valdani Subzone, Tragophylloceras ibex Zone, lower Pliensbachian	NMW 91.296.2.2 "a large, isolated and incomplete forefin"	A leptonectid ichthyosaur	
Temnodontosaurus	T. platyodon					Temnodontosaurus
Xiphodracon	X. goldencapensis	Golden Cap	Green Ammonite Member, Davoei Zone, Maculatum Subzone, lower Pliensbachian	ROM VP52596 "almost complete skull and skeleton, missing one hindfin and the posterior part of the tail"	A leptonectid ichthyosaur	Xiphodracon

=== Thalattosuchia ===
Thalattosuchia of the Charmouth Mudstone Formation
Genus	Species	Location	Stratigraphic position	Material	Notes	Images
Thalattosuchia	Indeterminate	Stonebarrow beach, Charmouth; Conesby Quarry, Scunthorpe	Black Ven Mudstone Member	NHMUK PV R 36710, incomplete snout; NHMUK PV R 9731, axis and four post-axial cervical vertebrae. Two incomplete axial ribs, the lef fourth cervical rib, and two cervical rib fragments; NHMUK PV R 36 711, dorsal vertebra from the caudal end of the dorsal series, and the neural arch of another dorsal vertebra, both held together by matrix	Early Thalattosaurian specimens that can't be referred to any concrete genus. Includes a possible early diverging metriorhynchoid	
Turnersuchus	T. hingleyae	1 kilometer west of the Charmouth Heritage Coast Centre	Belemnite Marl Member	LRM 2021/45, a partial skeleton including cranial material, cervical, dorsal, and caudal vertebrae, ribs, right pectoral girdle, partial limb bones, and an osteoderm	An early diverging thalattosuchian.	Turnersuchus

=== Pterosauria ===
Pterosauria of the Charmouth Mudstone Formation
Genus	Species	Location	Stratigraphic position	Material	Notes	Images
Dimorphodon	D. macronyx	Charmouth; Lyme Regis	Black Ven Marl Member	Tail Fragments; Tibia; Femur; Humerus; Phalanax; Metacarps; Semi-Complete Skeletons	A basal pterosaur and the type member of the family Dimorphodontidae.	Dimorphodon
Dimorphodontidae	Indeterminate	Charmouth, Black Ven; Lyme Regis	Black Ven Marl Member	OUM J.53070; NHMUK PV R1595, wing phalanges	A basal dimorphodontid pterosaur. Known as "Charmouth dimorphodontid" it shares resemblance with the genus Dimorphodon.	
Dimorphodontidae	Indeterminate	Near Seatown	Lower Pliensbachian member	Associated remains of the rostrum and mandibles	A basal dimorphodontid pterosaur. The relatively deep rostrum and extreme size dimorphism in the dentition show clear similarities to Dimorphodon, also from the Lias of Dorset. The distinctive dentition, in which the first four pairs of rostral teeth and two pairs of mandibular teeth are relatively large and fang-like, while the remaining teeth are remarkably small and short.	

=== Dinosauria ===
Dinosauria of the Charmouth Mudstone Formation
Genus	Species	Location	Stratigraphic position	Material	Notes	Images
Coelophysidae	"M." lydekkeri	Lyme Regis	Black Ven Marl Member	NHMUK OR 41352, isolated tooth	It was identified as Zanclodon(?) sp. b., M. lydekkeri and reassigned as M.(?) lydekkeri. It was found on mostly of recent works to be non diagnostic, probably a coelophysoid.	
Dornraptor	D. normani	Lower cliff face, Charmouth	Black Ven Marl Member (Likely)	NHMUK OR 39496, Partial hind limb; GSM 109560, left femur	An Averostran theropod, possible Ceratosaur or Tetanuran. In 2024 was formally described, but referred to the older Blue Lias. A paper non quoted on the description relocated it on the Charmouth mudstone.	Dornraptor
Neotheropoda	Indeterminate	Near Lyme Regis	obtusum Zone, obtusum subzone	NHMUK PV R36855, Left fibula, ~ 17 cm long	Previously misidentified as a referred specimen of the pterosaur Dimorphodon macronyx. Considered an early branching neotheropod, with a size range similar to Coelophysis bauri, representing an individual of approximately 10 kg.	NHMUK PV R36855
Massopoda	Indeterminate	lower cliff face, Charmouth	obtusum Zone, obtusum subzone	GSM 109561 pedal ungual	A sauropodomorph, possibly a member of Massopoda. While it was not associated with BMNH 39496 or GSM 109560 and was not assigned to "Merosaurus" it was classified as coming from an indeterminate theropod. Mortimer found closer resemblance with pedal unguals of basal massopods like Blikanasaurus and Jingshanosaurus.	
Scelidosaurus	S. harrisonii	Charmouth, Black Ven; Black Ven landslip	Black Ven Marl Member	NHMUK OR42068. Six osteoderms; NHMUK OR42070. Phalanx.; NHMUK OR42072. Large bone fragment – indet.; NHMUK OR42074. Ulna (paired with NHMOR41323).; NHMUK OR43062. Shaft of a large humerus, crushed proximal femur, fibula, fragmentary radius?, other large bone fragments; NHMUK OR46011. Probable rib fragment – indet.; BRSMG Ce12785. Partial skull and some disarticulated postcranial elements; BRSMG Ce12787. Partly eroded femur and vertebra; BRSMG Ce12788. cervical osteoderms.; BRSMG Ce12789. Vertebra and bone fragments; BRSMG Cf2781. nine middle-distal caudal vertebrae and some haemal arches with some organic (kerogenized) remains of the skin preserved.; BRSMG LEGL 0004. Articulated skeleton; BRSMG LEGL 0005. Articulated partial skeleton; DORCM G.7542. Osteoderms; DORCM G.10817. Osteoderms; CAMSM X39256. Cranial: disarticulated skull and jaw elements	A basal thyreophoran, and the type member of the family Scelidosauridae. One of the best known armored dinosaurs of the lower Jurassic, also the most complete found to date, with specimens preserving even the skin and dermal armour.	Sole´s Scelidosaurus
Scelidosaurus	S. "sp. A"	Belemnite Marls at Seatown	Belemnite Marl Member, Uptonia jamesoni Zone	DORCM G.7842. Three dorsal vertebrae in articulation	A basal thyreophoran, and the type member of the family Scelidosauridae. One of the best known armored dinosaurs of the lower Jurassic, also the most complete found to date, with specimens preserving even the skin and dermal armour.	Sole´s Scelidosaurus
Scelidosaurus	Cf. S. sp.	Foot of Black Ven, Charmouth	Asteroceras obtusum ammonoid zone, Black Ven Marl Member	NHMUK R6704, juvenile specimen; NHMUK R12019. A posterior fragment of the occiput and an articulated series of six cervical vertebrae; NHMUK R10103. Indeterminate bone fragments; NHMUK OR28333. Two scapulae; NHMUK OR32396. Radius; NHMUK OR39516. Osteoderms.; NHMUK OR39517. Caudal or?sacral vertebra, small distal caudal vertebra, small distal caudal; NHMUK OR39518. Haemal arch (chevron).; NHMUK OR39519. Two phalanges.; NHMUK OR39520. Ungual phalanx of ?pes.; NHMUK OR39521. Several bone fragments.; NHMUK OR40503. Tibia (proximal end).; NHMUK OR41322. Femur; NHMUK OR41323. Radius; NHMUK OR41324. Scapular blade; NHMUK OR41325. Humerus; NHMUK OR41326. Fibula; NHMUK OR41327. Two caudal vertebrae; NHMUK OR41328. Three metatarsals; NHMUK OR41329. Osteoderm; NHMUK OR41330. Ischium	A basal thyreophoran, and the type member of the family Scelidosauridae. One of the best known armored dinosaurs of the lower Jurassic, also the most complete found to date, with specimens preserving even the skin and dermal armour.	Sole´s Scelidosaurus

=== Fish ===
Numerous fish species are known from the Charmouth Mudstone and underlying Blue Lias, from such horizons as the "Fish Bed" of the Shales With Beef Member.

Fish of the Charmouth Mudstone Formation
Genus	Species	Location	Stratigraphic position	Material	Notes	Images
Acrodus					A hybodont shark	
Caturus	Spp.				An amiiform fish related to bowfins	
Chondrosteus	C. acipenseroides				A chondrosteid acipenseriform fish, related to sturgeon and paddlefish	Chondrosteus
"Coccolepis"	"C." liassicus				A coccolepidid "palaeoniscoid" fish, probably does not belong to the genus	
Dapedium	Spp.				A dapediiform fish	
Dorsetichthys	D. bechei				A stem-group teleost	Dorsetichthys
Furo	F. orthostomus				A member of Ionoscopiformes within Halecomorphi	Furo
Holophagus	H. gulo				A coelacanth	
Hybodus					A hybodont shark	
Myriacanthus	M. paradoxus, M. granulatus		Black Ven Marl Member		A myriacanthid closely related to modern chimaeras	Myriacanthus
Oxygnathus	O. ornatus				A palaeonisciform fish	
Palidiplospinax					A synechodontiform shark	
Platysiagum	P. sclerocephalum				A platysiagid fish	
Ptycholepis	P. gracilis, P. curtus				A palaeonisciform fish	
Saurorhynchus	S. brevirostris, S. anningae				A member of Saurichthyiformes	
Squaloraja	S. tenuispina, S. polyspondyla				A ray-like holocephalan fish related to modern chimaeras	Squaloraja

=== Insects ===
Numerous species of insect are known from concretions, predominately in the Black Ven Marl Member.

Insects of the Charmouth Mudstone Formation
Genus	Species	Location	Stratigraphic position	Material	Notes	Images
Anglophlebia	A. gigantea	Woodstones, Black Ven	Black Ven Marl Member	NHMUK In.51030, part and counterpart of partial forewing	Damsel-dragonfly	
Archaeolepis	A. mane	Birchi Nodules, Black Ven	Shales with Beef	Isolated wing	Among the oldest known lepidopterans	
Archelcana	A. durnovaria	Woodstones	Black Ven Marl Member	BMNH In 59162	Elcanid orthopteran	
Austaulius	A. haustrum	Monmouth Beach, Lyme Regis	Black Ven Marl Member	NHMUK II 3103	Necrotauliid caddisfly	
Brevicula	B. gradus, B. maculata	Flatstones, Woodstones;Monmouth Beach, Lyme Regis	Black Ven Marl Member	B. gradus: Holotype: NHMUK In.53993, female with ovipositor, B. maculata: Holotype: NHMUK II.3086, isolated Tegmina	Dermapterid earwig	
Brochocoleus	B. maculatus	Flatstones, Stonebarrow	Black Ven Marl Member	BMNH In 49577, 59133, 59361, 59154	Ommatid beetle	
Chrismooreia	C. michaelbehei	Charmouth	Obtusum Zone	Part and counterpart of a mostly complete specimen	Asiopterid damsel-dragonfly	
Dacryoderma	B. teres	Charmouth-by-pass construction site	Obtusum Zone	Isolated tegmen	Dermapterid earwig	
Daniilacheta	D. aristovi	Monmouth Beach, Brooki bed	Shales with Beef Member	ZIN LD/Orth 19	Protogryllidae cricket	
Dorsettia	D. laeta	Flatstones	Black Ven Marl Member	BMNH In 59375, a male hindwing fragment	Campterophlebiid damsel-dragonfly, genus also known from China	
Durnovaria	D. parallela	Flatstones	Black Ven Marl Member	BMNH In 59171	Aerophasmatid, Stem group of Phasmatodea	
Elaterina	E. liassica	Lyme Regis	Black Ven Marl Member	BMNH In 59369	Click beetle	
Elaterophanes	E. regius	Flatstones	Black Ven Marl Member	BMNH In 59385, 53952	Click beetle	
Eoptychoptera	E. spectra	Flatstones	Black Ven Marl Member	BMNH In 49226	Ptychopterid fly, formerly referred to the genus Prodocidia	
Hagla	H. cf. gracilis	Flatstones	Black Ven Marl Member	BMNH In 59167	Haglidae hump-winged cricket	
Holcoptera	H. giebeli, H. alisonae; H. schlotheimi	Flatstones; Bed 75, Black Ven; Catherstone Lane; Monmouth Beach, Lyme Regis	Black Ven Marl Member	Complete specimen, isolated wings	Coptoclavid beetle	
Hypsothemis	H. fraseri	Flatstones	Black Ven Marl Member	BMNH In 59109, a hindwing	Campterophlebiid damsel-dragonfly, genus also known from China and Kazakhstan	
Jurachorista	J. bashkuevi	Monmouth Beach, Brooki bed	Shales with Beef Member	ISEA I-F/MP/4/1637/14	Eomeropid scorpionfly	
Lateophlebia	L. anglicanopsis	Flatstones	Black Ven Marl Member	BMNH In 49573, 59376	Campterophlebiid damsel-dragonfly	
Lethonectes	L. naucoroides	Flatstones	Black Ven Marl Member	BMNH In 49615, 51014(59383)	Belostomatidae giant water bug	
Liassocorixa	L. dorsetica	Flatstones	Black Ven Marl Member	BMNH In 59166	Corixid bug	
Liassocupes	L. parvus	Flatstones	Black Ven Marl Member	BMNH In 64008, 49210	Ommatid beetle	
Liassophlebia	L. pseudomagnifica	Stonebarrow	Black Ven Marl Member	NHMUK In.64000, partial hindwing	Liassophlebiid damsel-dragonfly	
Locustopsis	L. spectabilis	Flatstones; Monmouth Beach, Brooki bed	Black Ven Marl Member	ZIN LD/Orth 1, Orth 4, Orth 10, Orth 18, Orth 31	Locustopsid grasshopper	
Megarhyphus	M. amberae	Monmouth Beach, Brooki bed	Shales with Beef Member	NHML In 28447	Anisopodidae wood gnat	
"Mesocixiella"	"M." fennahi	Flatstones	Black Ven Marl Member	BMNH In 53942	Fulgoridiid planthopper, does not belong to the genus Mesocixiella	
Metaraphidia	M. confusa	Charmouth (GSM)	Black Ven Marl Member	GSM 117552	Snakefly	
Micromacula	M. gracilis	Flatstones, Birchi Nodules; Flatstones, Black Ven	Shales with Beef; Black Ven Marl Member	BMNH In 49230	Regiatid orthopteran	
Mimemala	M. giganteum	Flatstones	Black Ven Marl Member	BMNH In 51026	Schizocoleid beetle	
Nannoblattina	N. petulantia	Flatstones	Black Ven Marl Member	BMNH In 53929, 51004	Mesoblattinid cockroach	
Nannotanyderus	N. oliviae	Monmouth Beach, Brooki bed	Shales with Beef Member	ISEA I-F/MP/2/1621/13, 12	Tanyderid fly	
Neomeridium	N. trifurcum	Woodstones	Black Ven Marl Member	BMNH In 59151, 51039, 53901, 64014	Pachymeridiid Lygaeoid bug	
Oligophryne	O. britannica	Stonebarrow Hill	Black Ven Marl Member	Coll. Ansorge fly No 1	Oligophrynidae fly	
Omma	O. liassicum	Flatstones	Black Ven Marl Member	BMNH 59132	Ommatid beetle, genus extant	
Orthophlebia	O. capillata	Flatstones	Black Ven Marl Member	BMNH In 53924, an exoskeleton (wings & thorax)	Orthophlebiid scorpionfly	
Orichalcum	O. ornatum	Flatstones, Birchi Nodules	Shales with Beef	BMNH In 53983	Triassomanteidae grasshopper	
Paraprosbole	P. rotruda	Flatstones	Black Ven Marl Member	BMNH In 59374, 48162, 64395	Tettigarctid cicada	
Propreocoris	P. maculatus	Woodstones	Black Ven Marl Member	BMNH In 59152	Stem-group to Ochteridae and Gelastocoridae	
Protogryllus	P. (Archaegryllodes) magnus	Flatstones	Black Ven Marl Member	BMNH In 44003, 51016, 51022, 59373	Protogryllidae cricket	
Protohagla	P. langi	Flatstones	Black Ven Marl Member	BMNH In 59018	Haglid cricket	
Protomyrmeleon	P. cf. brunonis	Charmouth burden pile	Black Ven Marl Member	AR 428	Protomyrmeleontidae winged insect	
Protorthophlebia	P. latipennis	Flatstones	Black Ven Marl Member	BMNH In 49575, 53954, 53963, 59120, 59365, 59371, 59384	Protorthophlebiid scorpionfly	
Priscaenigma	P. obtusa	Flatstones	Black Ven Marl Member	BMNH In 53898	Snakefly	
Pseudopolycentropus	P. triangularis	Woodstones	Black Ven Marl Member	BMNH In 53915	Pseudopolycentropodid scorpionfly	
Pterocimex	P. jacksoni	Woodstones	Black Ven Marl Member	BMNH in 53909, 49589, 51048, 59359	Nepomorphan	
Regiata	R. scutra	Flatstones	Black Ven Marl Member	BMNH In 64027	Regiatid orthopteran	
Rhipidoblattina	R. ssp.	Flatstones	Black Ven Marl Member	BMNH In 49212, 49249, 53909, 53920	Caloblattinidae cockroach	
Rossiphlebia	R. jacksoni	Flatstones	Black Ven Marl Member	NHMUK In.53999, part and counterpart of a partial hindwing	Liassophlebiid damsel-dragonfly	
Tarsabedus	T. menkei	0.6 km east Charmouth	Black Ven Marl Member	BRSMG Cc 688	Belostomatidae giant water bug	
Tersus	T. crowsoni	Flatstones	Black Ven Marl Member	BMNH In 53949, 59038	Schizophorid beetle	

=== Plants ===
Genus	Species	Stratigraphic position	Material	Notes	Images
Ctenozamites	C. cycadea	Lyme regis; Charmouth	Isolated shoots	A "Seed Fern" of the group with Corystospermales	
Cycadites	C. rectangularis	Lyme regis	Isolated shoots	A possible Cycadophyte leaf, related with Cycadales. Alternatively, it can be of Bennettite origin	
Cycadeoidea	C. gracilis	Lyme regis	Stems	Bennettite Trunks of the family Cycadeoidaceae	Cycadeoidea
Cycadopteris	C. jurensis	Lyme regis	Isolated shoots	A "Seed Fern" of the group with Corystospermales	Cycadopteris
Otozamites	O. obtusus	Lyme regis; Charmouth; Seatown	Isolated shoots	Bennettite leafs of the family Williamsoniaceae	Otozamites
Pagiophyllum	P. peregrinum; P. sewardii	Lyme regis; Charmouth; Seatown; Wear Cliffs	Isolated shoots	Conifer shoots of the family Hirmeriellaceae or Araucariaceae	Pagiophyllum

== See also ==
- List of fossiliferous stratigraphic units in England
- List of dinosaur-bearing rock formations
- Blue Lias, England
- Sorthat Formation, Denmark
- Hasle Formation, Denmark
- Zagaje Formation, Poland
- Drzewica Formation, Poland
- Ciechocinek Formation, Poland
- Borucice Formation, Poland
- Rotzo Formation, Italy
- Saltrio Formation, Italy
- Moltrasio Formation, Italy
- Marne di Monte Serrone, Italy
- Calcare di Sogno, Italy
- Podpeč Limestone, Slovenia
- Coimbra Formation, Portugal
- El Pedregal Formation, Spain
- Fernie Formation, Canada
- Whiteaves Formation, British Columbia
- Navajo Sandstone, Utah
- Aganane Formation, Morocco
- Tafraout Group, Morocco
- Azilal Formation, Morocco
- Budoš Limestone, Montenegro
- Kota Formation, India
- Cañadón Asfalto Formation, Argentina
- Los Molles Formation, Argentina
- Kandreho Formation, Madagascar
- Elliot Formation, South Africa
- Clarens Formation, South Africa
- Evergreen Formation, Australia
- Cattamarra Coal Measures, Australia
- Hanson Formation, Antarctica
- Mawson Formation, Antarctica
