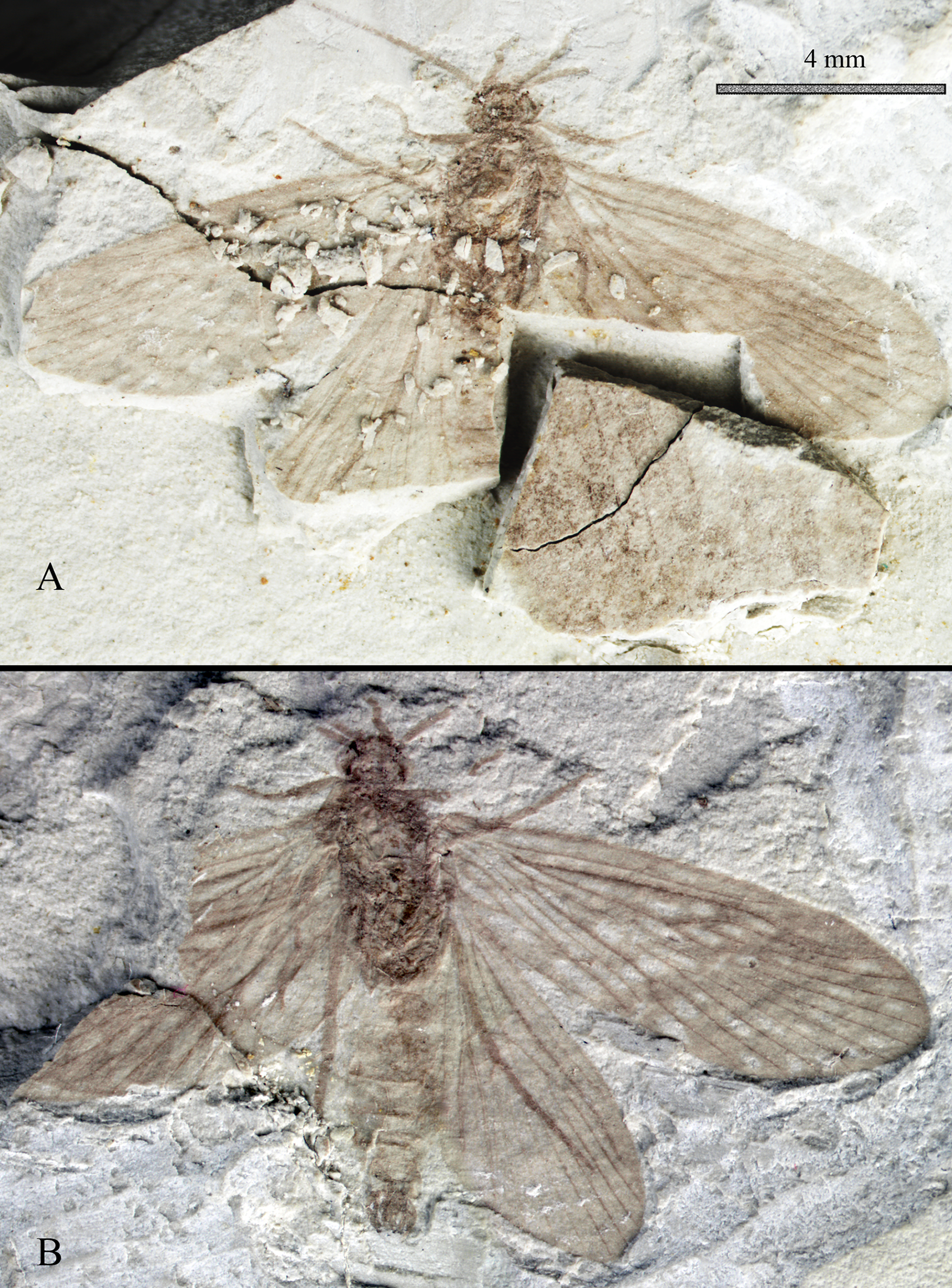
- Acisarcuatus variradius

Scientific classification
- Kingdom: Animalia
- Phylum: Arthropoda
- Clade: Pancrustacea
- Class: Insecta
- Order: Trichoptera
- Family: †Necrotauliidae; Handlirsch 1906

Species
- See Text

= Necrotauliidae =

Necrotauliidae Temporal range: Late Triassic–Aptian

Extinct family of caddisflies

Necrotauliidae is an extinct family of Mesozoic amphiesmenopterans. While previously considered a paraphyletic grouping of "basal Trichoptera, basal Lepidoptera, and advanced stem-Amphiesmenoptera", they have recently been considered early diverging caddisflies. Other authors have considered them to be basal amphiesmenopterans.

== Genera ==
After

- †Acisarcuatus Liu et al. 2014 Daohugou, China, Middle Jurassic (Callovian)
- †Archiptilia Handlirsch 1939 Green Series, Germany, Early Jurassic (Toarcian)
- †Austaulius Kelly et al. 2018 Lilstock Formation, United Kingdom, Late Triassic (Rhaetian), Blue Lias, United Kingdom, Early Jurassic (Hettangian), Charmouth Mudstone Formation, United Kingdom, Early Jurassic (Sinemurian)
- †Cretotaulius Sukacheva 1982 Glushkovo Formation, Russia, Late Jurassic (Tithonian)
- †Epididontus Handlirsch 1939 Green Series, Germany, Toarcian
- †Karataulius Sukacheva 1968 Karabastau Formation, Kazakhstan, Middle/Late Jurassic (Callovian/Oxfordian)
- †Mesotrichopteridium Handlirsch 1906 Green Series, Germany, Toarcian
- †Metarchitaulius Handlirsch 1939 Green Series, Germany, Toarcian
- †Nannotrichopteron Handlirsch 1906 Green Series, Germany, Toarcian
- †Necrotaulius Handlirsch 1906 Cow Branch Formation, United States, Late Triassic, Lilstock Formation, United Kingdom, Rhaetian Green Series, Posidonia Shale, Germany, Toarcian Beacon Limestone Formation, Whitby Mudstone, United Kingdom, Toarcian Shiti Formation, China, Middle Jurassic (Bajocian) Itat Formation, Russia, Middle Jurassic (Bathonian), Jiulongshan Formation, China, Callovian Karabastau Formation, Kazakhstan, Callovian/Oxfordian Glushkovo Formation, Russia, Tithonian Weald Clay, United Kingdom, Early Cretaceous (Hauterivian)
- †Anecrotaulius Engel, 2022 (=Necrotaulius qingshilaense Hong, 1984) Yixian Formation, China, Early Cretaceous (Aptian)
- †Paranecrotaulius Engel, 2022 (=Necrotaulius proximus Sukatsheva, 1973) Madygen Formation, Kyrgyzstan, Middle/Late Triassic (Ladinian-Carnian)
- †Palaeotaulius Handlirsch 1939 Green Series, Germany, Toarcian
- †Pararchitaulius Handlirsch 1939 Green Series, Germany, Toarcian
- †Parataulius Handlirsch 1939 Green Series, Germany, Toarcian
- †Paratrichopteridium Handlirsch 1906 Green Series, Germany, Toarcian Makarova Formation, Russia, Toarcian
- †Prorhyacophila Riek 1955
- †Pseudorthophlebia Handlirsch 1906 Green Series, Germany, Toarcian, Lulworth Formation, United Kingdom, Early Cretaceous (Berriasian)
- †Pteromixanum Sukatsheva and Jarzembowski 2001 Purbeck Group, United Kingdom, Berriasian
- †Scyphindusia Sukatsheva 1985 Kalgan Formation, Russia, Callovian
