= Beacon Limestone Formation =

Geological formation in England

- Stratigraphic range: Upper Pliensbachian–Toarcian Spinatum-lowermost Thouarsense; ~185–175 Ma
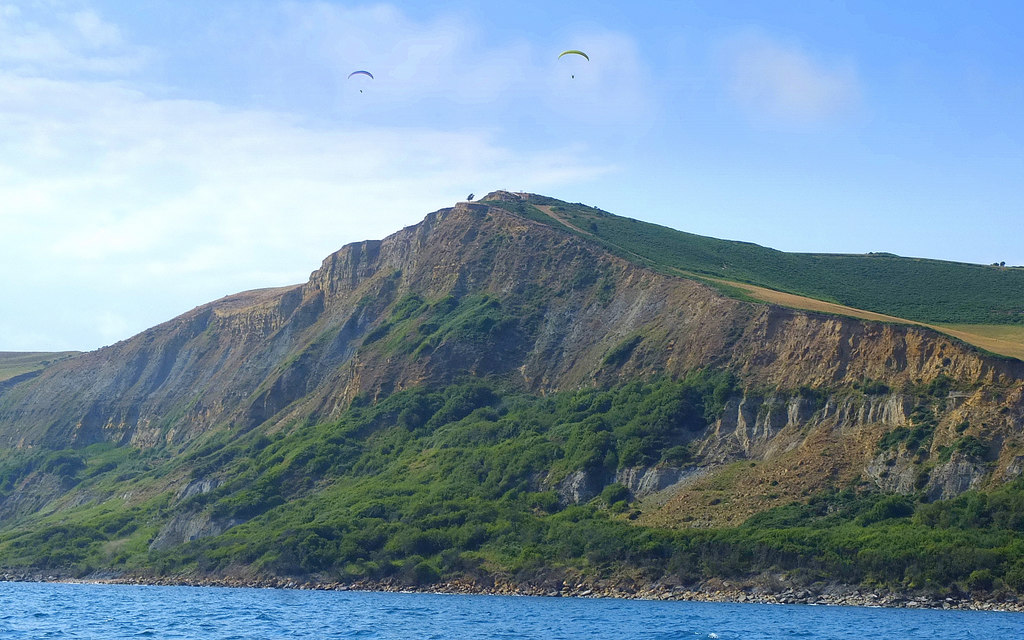
- Cliff exposure at Thorncombe Beacon
- Type: Geological formation
- Unit of: Lias Group
- Sub-units: Marlstone Rock, Barrington & Eype Mouth Limestone Members
- Underlies: Bridport Sand Formation
- Overlies: Dyrham Formation
- Thickness: Up to 5 metres (16 ft); Averaging <1.5 metres (4.9 ft)

Lithology
- Primary: Limestone

Location
- Coordinates: 50.9°N 2.8°W
- Approximate paleocoordinates: 38.4°N 7.4°E
- Region: Somerset, Dorset
- Country: England
- Extent: Wessex Basin

Type section
- Named for: Thorncombe Beacon
- Location: Cliff exposure beneath Thorncombe Beacon
- Beacon Limestone Formation (England)

The Beacon Limestone Formation, historically known as the Junction Bed, is a formation of the early Jurassic age (Pliensbachian–Toarcian). It lies above the Dyrham Formation and below the Bridport Sand Formation. It forms part of the Lias Group. It is found within the Wessex Basin and parts of Somerset, in England. It is well known for the Strawberry Bank Lagerstätte, which contains the 3-dimensionally preserved remains of vertebrates, including marine crocodyliformes, ichthyosaurs and fish, as well as insect compression fossils.

== Fossil content ==
Among others, the following fossils have been reported from the formation:

=== Vertebrates ===
Vertebrates of the Beacon Limestone
Genus	Species	Location	Stratigraphic position	Abundance	Notes	Images
Hauffiopteryx	H. typicus	Strawberry Bank	Falciferum zone	Lectotype: GPIT 1491/4, referred: BRLSI M1399, BRLSI M1400, BRLSI M1401, BRLSI M1403, BRLSI M1404 and BRLSI M1406 partial skeletons	Ichthyosaur subsequently suggested to belong to Leptonectes	
Stenopterygius	S. triscissus	Strawberry Bank	Falciferum zone	Holotype: GPIT 12/0224-2 referred: BRLSI M1405, BRLSI M1407, BRLSI M1408 and BRLSI M1409 partial skeletons	Ichthyosaur	
Pelagosaurus	P. typus	Strawberry Bank	Falciferum zone	"four isolated skulls and associated postcranial skeletal elements along with two articulated specimens, one of which is a small juvenile"	Thalattosuchian	
Pachycormus	P. macropterus	Strawberry Bank	Falciferum zone	BRLSI M1297, BRLSI M1299, BRLSI M1320, BRLSI M1332, BRLSI M1359, BRLSI M1389, BRLSI M1395, BRLSI M1341, BRLSI M1351, BRLSI M1366, BRLSI M1393	Pachycormiform fish	
Leptolepis	Indeterminate	Strawberry Bank	Falciferum zone	BRLSI M1259 complete specimen.	4–8 cm (1.6–3.1 in) in length	GB3D
Lepidotes	Indeterminate	Strawberry Bank	Falciferum zone		40–45 cm (16–18 in) in length	
Caturus	Indeterminate	Strawberry Bank	Falciferum zone	"two specimens, including an isolated neurocranium (BRLSI M1288)"	Amiiform fish	BRLSI

=== Invertebrates ===
Invertebrates of the Beacon Limestone
Genus	Species	Location	Stratigraphic position	Abundance	Notes	Images
Trivenapteron	T. moorei	Strawberry Bank	Falciferum zone		Dermapterid earwig	
Fulgoridulum	Indeterminate	Strawberry Bank	Falciferum zone		Fulgoridiid planthopper	
Necrotaulius	N. parvulus	Strawberry Bank	Falciferum zone		Necrotauliid Trichopteran	
Liassogomphidae	Indeterminate	Strawberry Bank	Falciferum zone		Odonata	
Elcanidae	Indeterminate	Strawberry Bank	Falciferum zone		Orthoptera	
Archegocimicidae	Indeterminate	Strawberry Bank	Falciferum zone		Hemiptera	
