= Worcester Basin =

Sedimentary basin in central England

The Worcester Basin or Worcester Graben is a sedimentary basin in central England, filled with mainly Permian and Triassic rocks. It trends roughly north-south and lies between the East Malverns Fault in the west and the Inkberrow Fault in the east. It forms part of a series of Permo-Triassic basins that stretch north-south across England, including the Cheshire Basin, Stafford Basin and the East Irish Sea Basin. These basins resulted from a regional rifting event that affected parts of North-West Europe, eastern North America and East Greenland.

== Fill ==
The oldest part of the sedimentary fill in the Worcester Basin is the Cisuralian (Early Permian) Bridgnorth Sandstone Formation, deposited in an aeolian environment. Unconformably above this is the Early Triassic Kidderminster Formation of pebble conglomerates and sandstones, deposited in a fluvial environment. The succession continues with the Early Triassic Wildmoor Sandstone Formation, followed by the Anisian (Middle Triassic) Bromsgrove Sandstone Formation, completing the Sherwood Sandstone Group (SSG) sequence in this basin. The overlying Mercia Mudstone Group (MMG) has the Tarporley Siltstone Formation locally at its base, but elsewhere it passes straight from the SSG into the Sidmouth Mudstone Formation. This unit locally contains a thick development of halite known as the Droitwich Halite Member. A thin sandstone is then developed, the Arden Sandstone Formation before passing upwards into the Branscombe Mudstone Formation. The final part of the MMG is the dolomitic mudstones of the Blue Anchor Formation. The Triassic succession is completed by a thinly developed Rhaetian age Penarth Group sequence of marine mudstones. The youngest preserved sequence in the basin is the fully marine Lias Group, consisting of the Blue Lias Formation, the Charmouth Mudstone Formation, the Dyrham Formation, the Marlstone Rock Formation, the Whitby Mudstone Formation and the Bridport Sand Formation.

== East Malverns Fault ==
This fault runs along the east side of the Malvern Hills, which are themselves formed of Neoproterozoic and Lower Paleozoic rocks. It is a normal fault with a dip of about 45° to the east, with a maximum estimated throw of about 2.5 kilometres (1.6 mi). There is evidence from seismic reflection data that this fault was active as a thrust during the Variscan orogeny. The fault was then reactivated in extension during the early part of the development of the Worcester Graben, which initially had a half graben geometry. It shows some further reactivation during the Jurassic.

== Inkberrow Fault ==
This major north-south trending fault, combined with the sub-parallel Weethley Fault, forms the eastern margin of the northern part of the Worcester Basin. Both faults throw down to the west and show evidence for activity during deposition of both the Triassic and Jurassic. The thickest part of the preserved Jurassic is found west of the Inkberrow Fault.
