= Cotham Marble =

Limestone variety from Great Britain

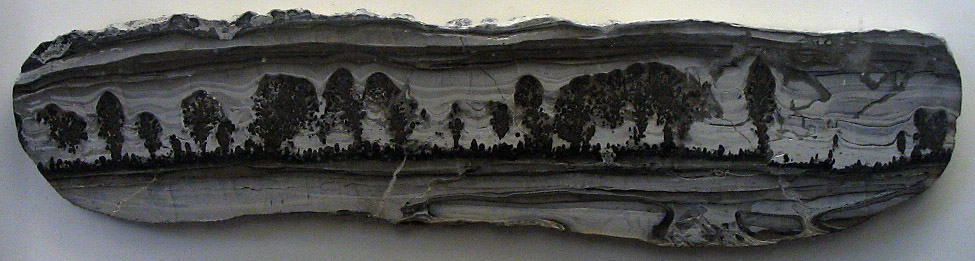
An example of Cotham Marble in the Natural History Museum

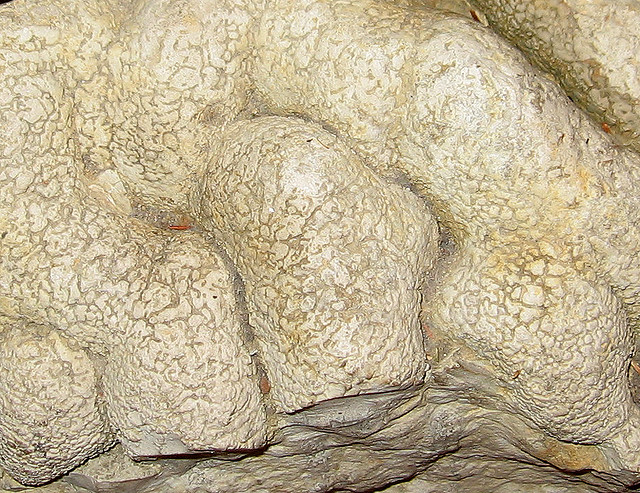
Top surface of a layer of Cotham Marble

Cotham Marble or Landscape Marble is a variety of Rhaetian (uppermost Triassic) stromatolitic limestone from the Penarth Group, found in south Wales and southwestern England in the area around Bristol, possibly extending to the south coast in east Devon. It is named after Cotham House in Cotham, Bristol. This limestone was used for ornamental purposes, particularly during the Victorian era. On cut and polished faces the stone has the appearance of a landscape, complete with ploughed fields, trees, and hedges.

== Occurrence ==
The beds known as Cotham Marble form part of the Cotham Member of the Lilstock Formation, part of the Penarth Group. They occur as lenses within the upper part of the Cotham Member. The marble is widely but patchily developed within the Cotham Member in its outcrop that extends from Glamorgan in South Wales, through the Bristol area to the coast of southeast Devon.

The lenses are typically between 3 and over 20 centimetres thick and are up to 3 metres across. Within each lens there is a basal convex upward layer from which the landscape rises. The 'hedge' layer is about 5 millimetres thick, marked at the top by many small bumps. The 'trees', arborescent structures, extend upwards from the hedge and are relatively constant in height at about 4–5 cm, although somewhat shorter near the lens edges. In most cases the lenses contain only a single layer of the landscape, but two, or exceptionally three layers may be developed, known as double and triple landscape marble respectively, each growing up from the crest of the underlying layer.

== Formation ==
The formation of the unusual structures in Cotham Marble has been ascribed to a number of causes. The earliest explanations were all inorganic, including evaporitic deposition and the effect of gas bubbles rising through the sediment. The interpretation that Cotham Marble is a stromatolite of algal origin was first proposed in 1961 and since has been confirmed by later work.

== Crazy Cotham ==
Although described as a variety of Cotham Marble, and often found in association with it, this limestone has a different origin. It consists of thin limestone flakes often set almost on edge within a sandy limestone. These are interpreted to have a mechanical origin as a form of mud-flake breccia.

== Uses ==
The marble is too soft for external use and has been mainly used to produce ornaments for display and as inlay in furnishings, such as tables and chimney pieces.
