= Dyrham Formation =

- Stratigraphic range: Pliensbachian
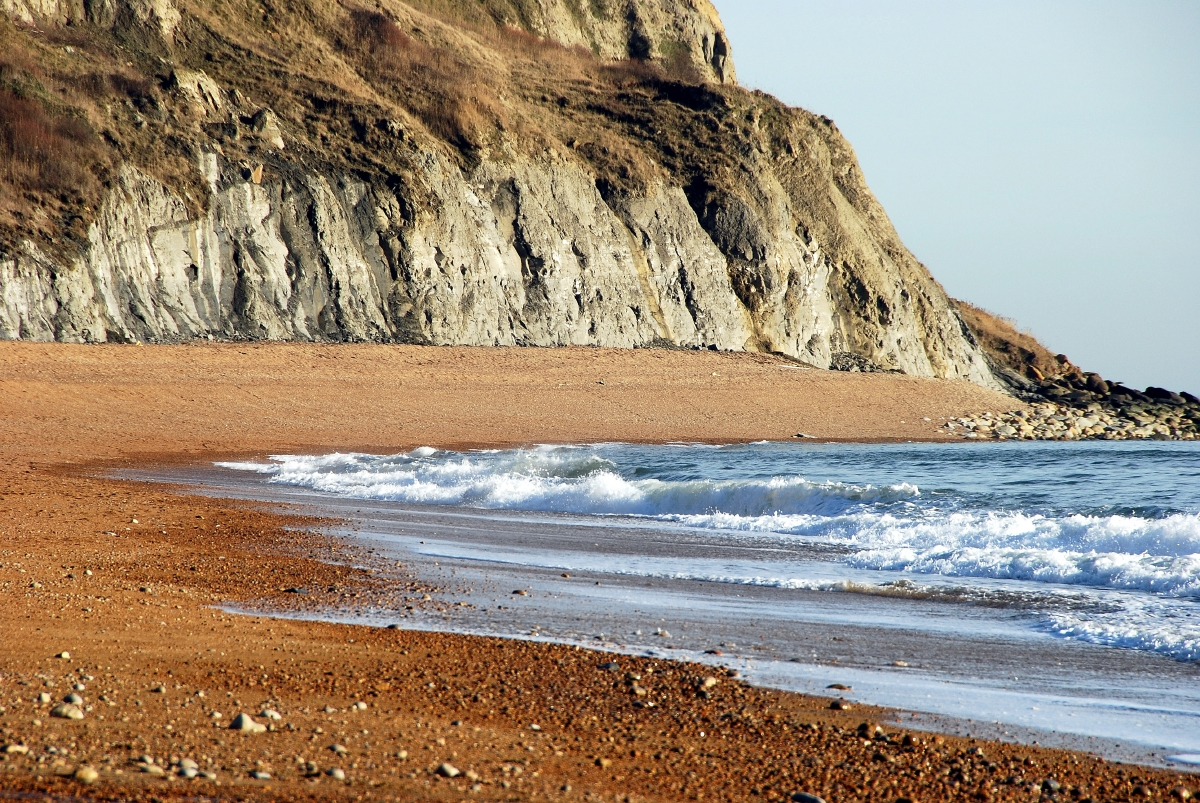
- Type: Formation
- Unit of: Lias Group
- Sub-units: Eype Clay Member, Down Cliff Sand Member, Thorncombe Sand Member
- Underlies: Beacon Limestone Formation, Marlstone Rock Formation
- Overlies: Charmouth Mudstone Formation
- Area: Wessex Basin, Worcester Basin, East Midlands Shelf
- Thickness: ~125 m

Lithology
- Primary: mudstone, silt, sand
- Other: ferruginous limestone

Location
- Region: England
- Country: United Kingdom

Type section
- Named for: Dyrham

The Dyrham Formation is a geologic formation in England. It preserves fossils dating back to the early part of the Jurassic period (Pliensbachian).

== See also ==
- List of fossiliferous stratigraphic units in England
