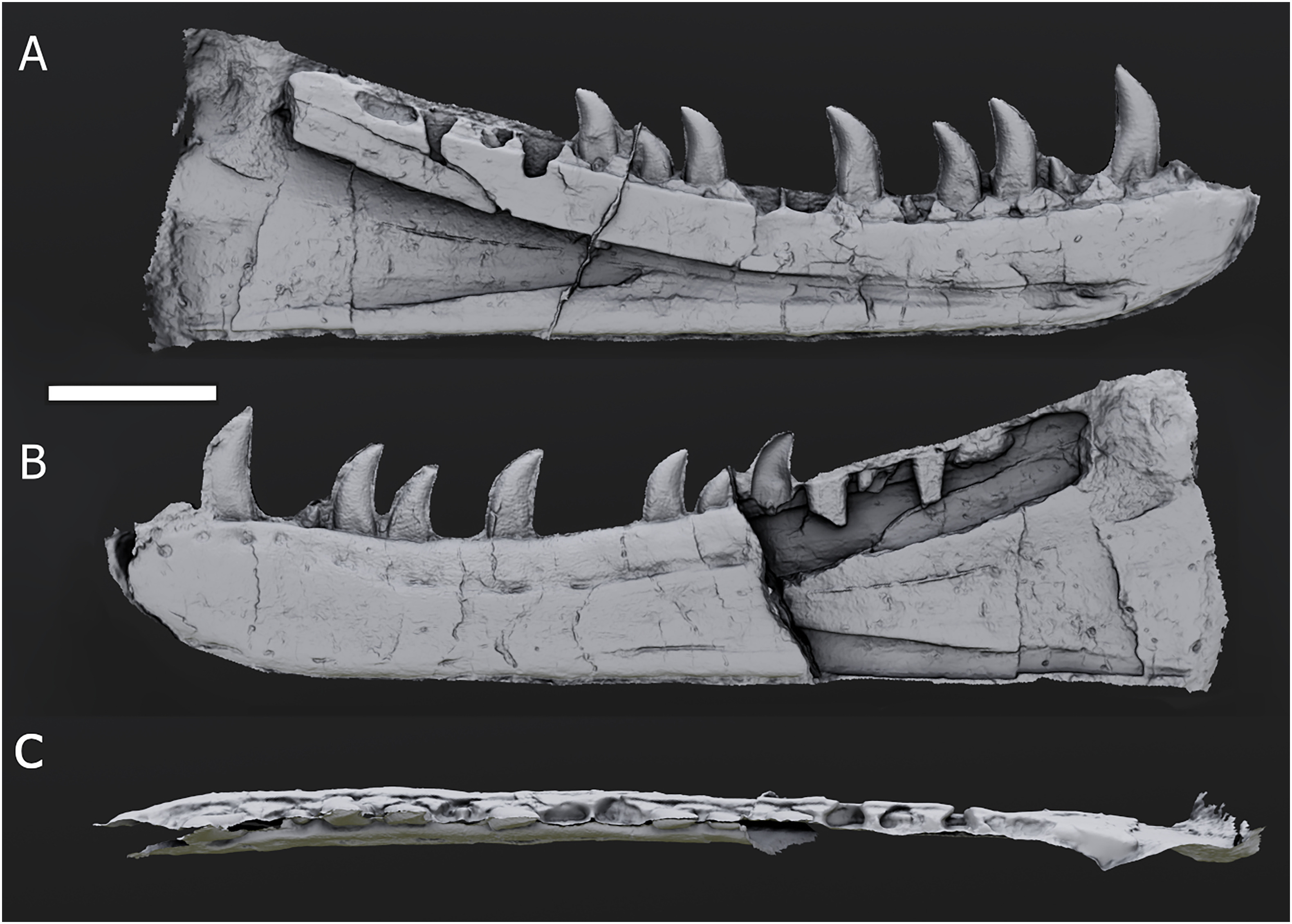
- Photogrammetric 3D reconstruction of the holotype dentary, in medial (A), lateral (B) and top-down (C) views

Scientific classification
- Kingdom: Animalia
- Phylum: Chordata
- Class: Reptilia
- Clade: Dinosauria
- Clade: Saurischia
- Clade: Theropoda
- Clade: Neotheropoda
- Genus: †Newtonsaurus; Evans et al., 2025
- Species: †N. cambrensis

Binomial name
- †Newtonsaurus cambrensis (Newton, 1899)

Synonyms
- Zanclodon cambrensis Newton, 1899; ?Megalosaurus cambrensis (Newton, 1899) Molnar, 1990 comb. nov.

= Newtonsaurus =

Newtonsaurus Temporal range: Late Triassic (Rhaetian), 202 Ma

Genus of theropod dinosaurs

Newtonsaurus (meaning "Newton's lizard") is an extinct genus of possibly coelophysoid theropod dinosaur from the Late Triassic (Rhaetian) Lilstock Formation of South Wales, Great Britain. The genus contains a single species, Newtonsaurus cambrensis, originally named as a species of Zanclodon, known from an external mould of the front half of a lower jaw. With an estimated total length of 5–7 metres (16–23 ft), it is suggested to have been one of the largest theropods known from the Triassic.

== History and classification ==
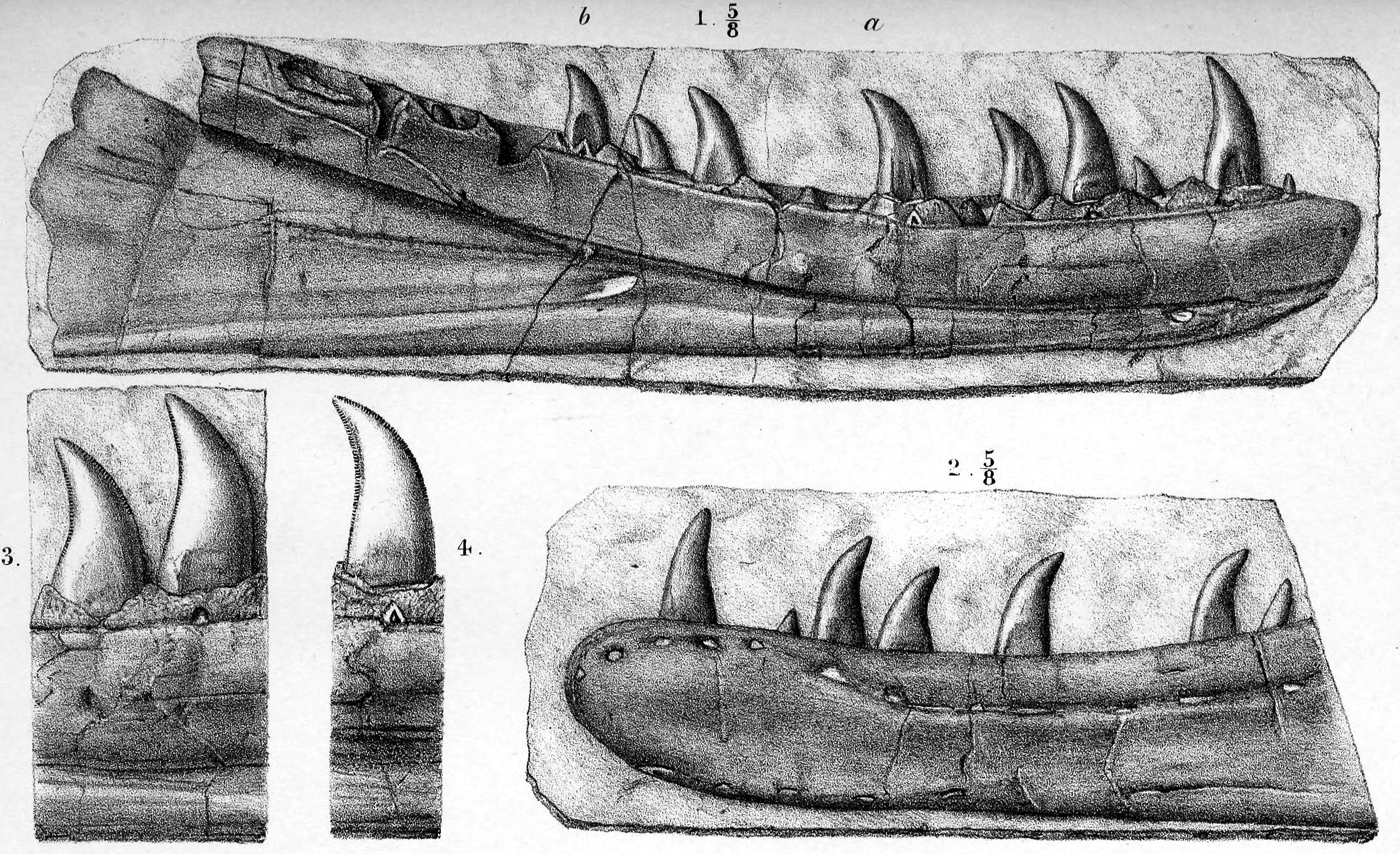
1899 illustration of the dentary mould in internal (top) and external (bottom) views

Newtonsaurus is only known from the holotype specimen GSM 6532 (a cast was made with the number BMNH R2912), an external mould of a dentary, which was discovered in the Late Triassic (Rhaetian) aged beds of the Lilstock Formation near Bridgend, Wales in 1898 by a mason who gave it to John David, and described by Edwin Tulley Newton in 1899 as a species of Zanclodon: Zanclodon cambrensis, the specific name referring to Cambria, the Latin name for Wales. The taxon was reassigned to ?Megalosaurus by Ralph Molnar in 1990, which was followed by Peter Galton in publications in 1998 and 2005. The species was historically considered to be a nomen dubium, as it apparently lacked diagnostic features used to distinguish it from other theropods. Oliver Rauhut & Hungerbüler in 2000 as well as Darren Naish and David Martill in 2007, considered the fossil to be of a coelophysoid grade theropod outside Averostra based on the low interdental plates and possession of only a single meckelian foramen, a view followed by Roger Benson in a 2010 publication. Matthew Carrano and colleagues in 2012 suggested it was a basal theropod or possibly an indeterminate predatory archosaur outside of Dinosauria.

The name "Newtonsaurus" was coined in 1999 in a privately circulated work by Stephan Pickering, containing an extract from an unpublished manuscript by the late Samuel Paul Welles, with the name in reference to Edwin Tulley Newton, the taxon's initial describer, though some sources have erroneously claimed that the generic name is in honor of Isaac Newton. Palaeontologists initially avoided using the name "Newtonsaurus" since its appearance in 1999 in Pickering's private document, although "Zanclodon" cambrensis or Megalosaurus cambrensis have both been used for this taxon. In a paper published in September 2025, Evans et al. re-examined the specimen, using photogrammetry of the moulds to create a 3D digital reconstruction of what the dentary would have looked like, which considerably aided in understanding its morphology, which otherwise had been somewhat difficult to interpret. They formalized the genus name Newtonsaurus, and confirmed that it represented a kind of non-averostran neotheropod distinct from all others currently known, and proposed that it represented a coelophysoid, though this conclusion was admitted to be a tentative one given the limited known remains.

== Description ==
Estimated size of Newtonsaurus compared to a human. Scale bar = 1 metre (3 ft 3 in)

The fossil, while only preserved as an external mould, preserves a high level of detail, down to the serrations on some of the teeth. The fossil only preserves the left dentary, the tooth-bearing front half of the lower jaw, up to the boundary between the dentary and surangular, with the back half of the lower jaw having been broken away before fossilisation. The slab bearing the impression of the inward (medial) side of the jaw preserves the whole jaw fragment, comprising the first 28 centimetres (11 in) of the lower jaw, while only part of the other (lateral) counterpart slab was found, comprising the frontmost 13 centimetres (5.1 in). Based on comparison with other basal theropods, the whole lower jaw was likely around 56 centimetres (22 in) ± 5 cm (2.0 inches) long, and the whole animal would likely have been around 5–7 metres (16–23 ft) long, which would make it one of the largest known Triassic theropods.

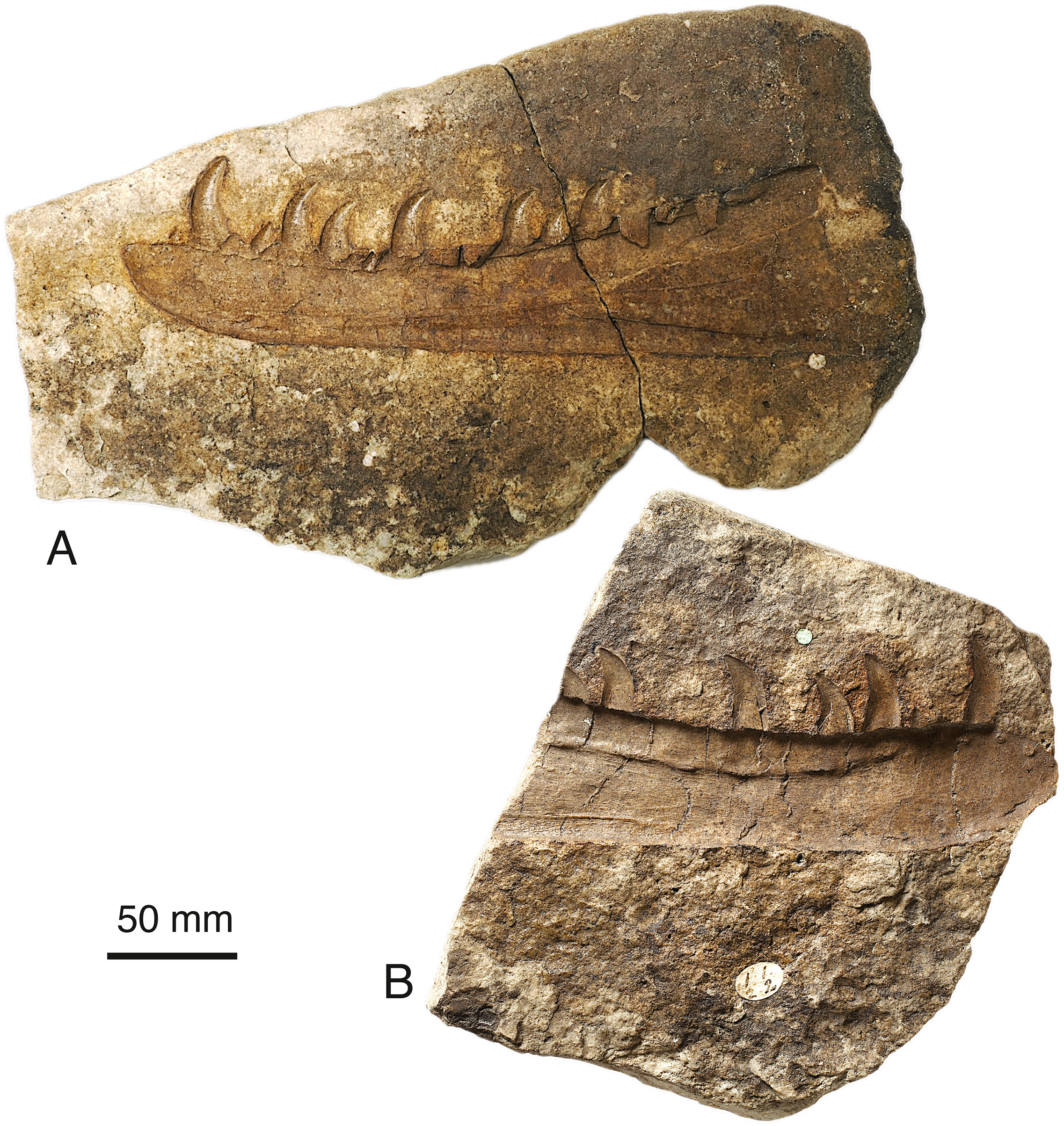
Photographs of the medial (above) and lateral (below) parts of the holotype mould

Overall, the shape of the dentary is very similar to that of Dilophosaurus, but is somewhat less deep. The dentary preserves sixteen tooth sockets (dental alveoli), seven of which bear erupted teeth and four showing replacement teeth. It probably had seventeen alveoli in life, with the most anterior (toward the front) alveolus not being preserved. The largest tooth was in the third socket. Between the teeth are unfused pentagonal-shaped interdental plates, with unfused interdental plates being generally characteristic of dinosaurs (except ceratosaurs), unlike in "rauisuchians" in which they are generally fused, and in ones which they are unfused they tend not to have a pentagonal shape. The front tip of the jaw is expanded, but less so than in Dilophosaurus and is not bulbous in shape. The distance from the suture between the surangular and the dentary and the base of the mandible is noticeably short, considerably shorter than the distance in the dentary of Dilophosaurus. On the outer (labial) side of the jaw, a groove (the lateral groove) is present with a number of foramina (holes in the bone where nerves and blood vessels pass through) running along its length. These foramina are noticeably elongate along the axis of the length of the jaw, a unique (autapomorphic) characteristic of this genus.

== Palaeoecology ==
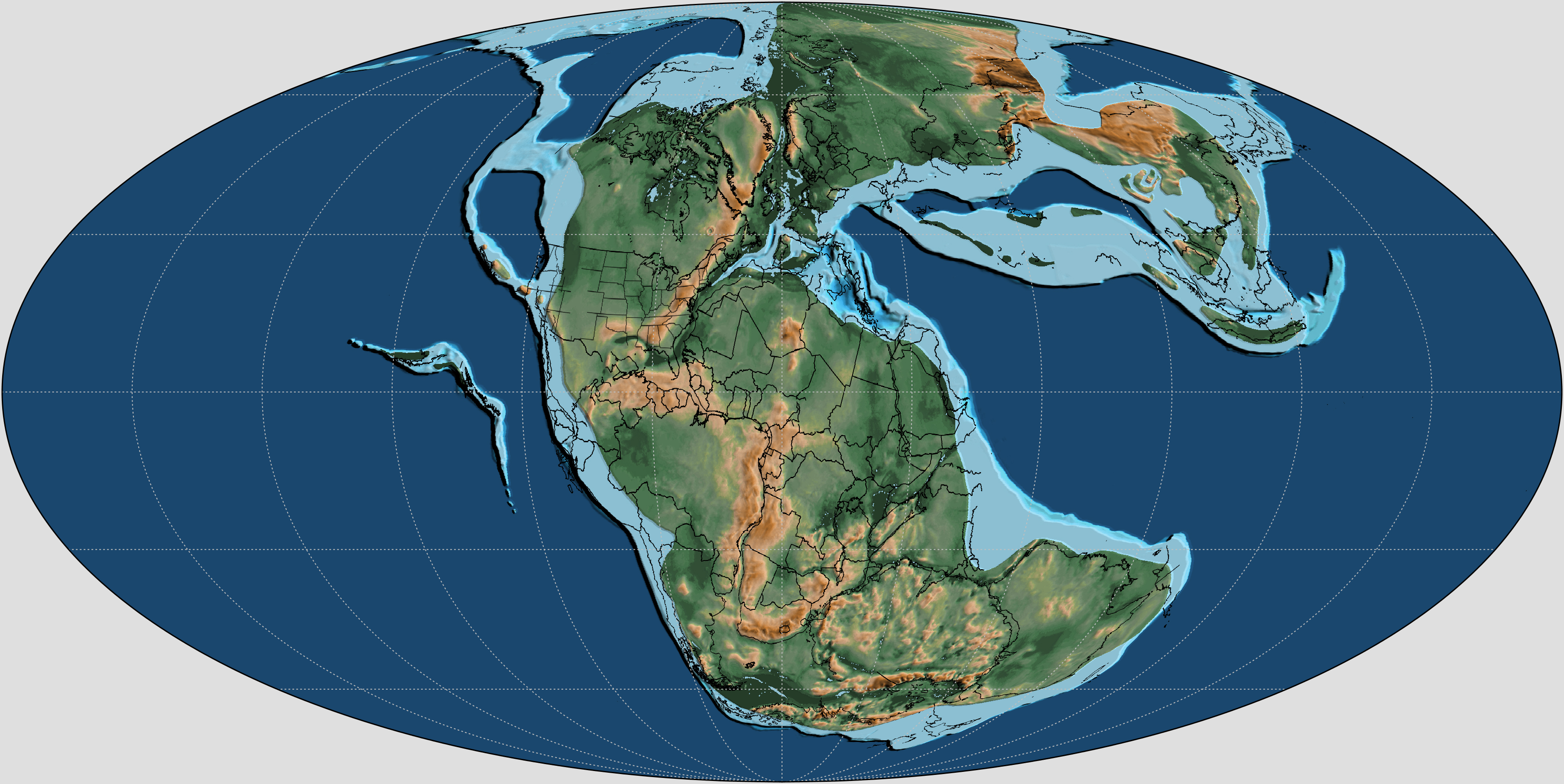
Map of Earth during the Rhaetian stage of the Late Triassic

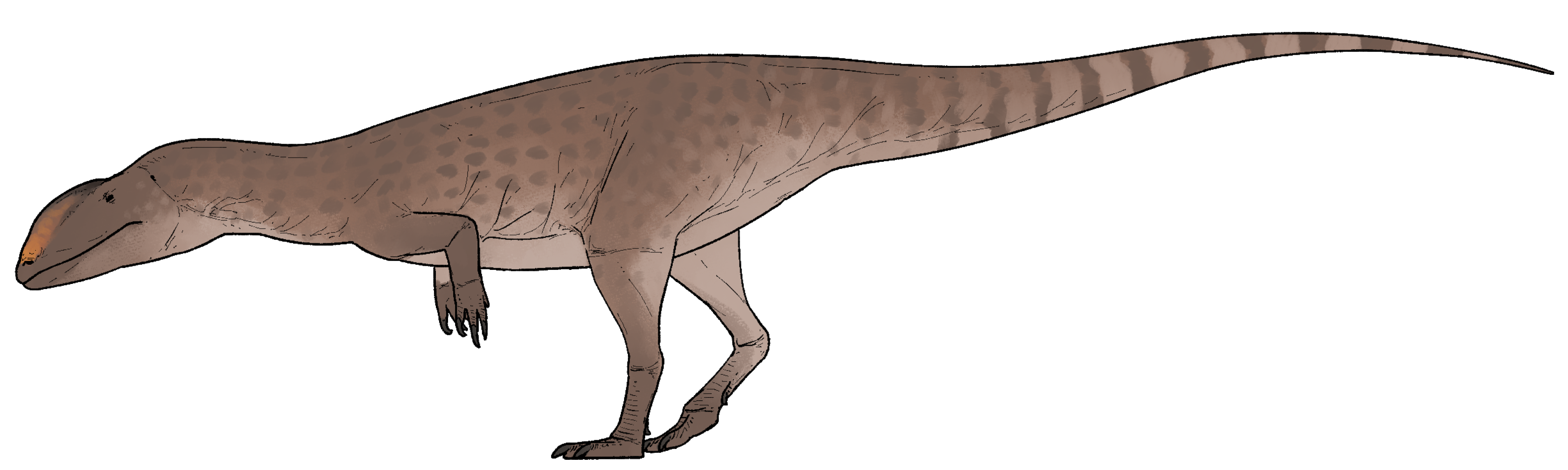
Speculative life restoration

Newtonsaurus probably originates from the Cotham Member of the Lilstock Formation, dating to approximately 202 million years ago. The Lilstock Formation was deposited in conditions varying from terrestrial to shallow marine. The lithology of the sandstone suggests that it originated from a marginal marine environment such as a lagoon or a beach, consistent with the remains of Newtonsaurus undergoing transport following its death, perhaps during a storm. The Lilstock Formation records the transition between the arid desert conditions that had dominated Britain (and the European part of Pangaea more broadly) during the Triassic period, towards marine conditions across much of Britain and the rest of Europe by the end of the Triassic as a result of the Rhaetian transgression.

Other dinosaurs known from the Penarth Group (of which the Lilstock Formation is part) include the large sauropodomorph Camelotia, as well as other indeterminate fragmentary dinosaur remains including those probably representing sauropodomorphs and theropods. Theropod teeth associated with a Camelotia specimen which were historically assigned to Avalonianus, were suggested by Galton in 1998 to represent the same species as Newtonsaurus cambrensis. Dinosaurs known from Late Triassic fissure fill deposits in the South Wales-South West England region include the sauropodomorphs Pantydraco, Thecodontosaurus, and the coelophysoid theropod Pendraig, as well as other vertebrates such as procolophonid, rhynchocephalian, and crocodylomorph reptiles, and early mammaliamorphs (mammal-line cynodonts) like tritylodontids and morganucodonts, but it is disputed whether these fissure fills are Rhaetian in age or at least some contain considerably older fossils dating to the Carnian-Norian. Fossils of a variety of insects are also known from the Lilstock Formation. Analysis of pollen from the Lilstock Formation suggests that contemporary vegetation included conifers, including the extinct family Cheirolepidiaceae, ferns including Osmundaceae, Matoniaceae, and Schizaeaceae, caytonialean "seed ferns", as well as liverworts and spikemosses.
