= Bridport Sand Formation =

Geological formation in England

- Stratigraphic range: Toarcian
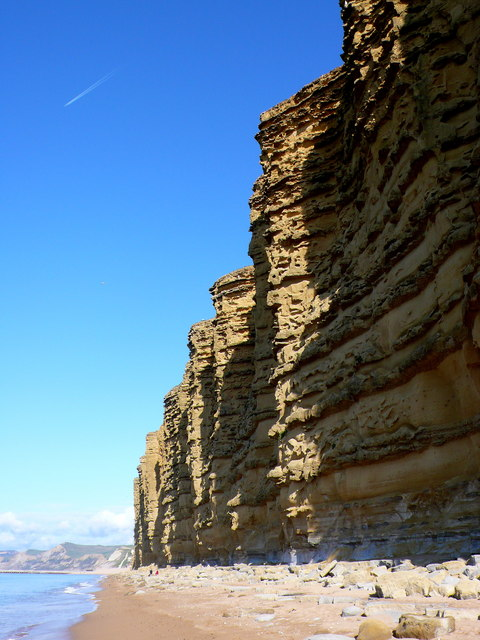
- Cliffs of Bridport Sand between Bridport and Burton Bradstock
- Type: Geological formation
- Unit of: Lias Group
- Sub-units: Down Cliff Clay Member
- Underlies: Inferior Oolite Group
- Overlies: Beacon Limestone Formation or Whitby Mudstone Formation
- Area: Wessex Basin, Worcester Basin
- Thickness: Approx. 120 m

Lithology
- Primary: Sand, Silt Sandstone
- Other: Clay

Location
- Country: England

Type section
- Named for: Bridport

The Bridport Sand Formation is a sandstone geological formation in central and southern England, noted for forming distinctive cliffs on the Jurassic Coast World Heritage Site. Bridport Sand is of Toarcian (Early Jurassic) age and is found in the Worcester and Wessex Basins.

The sandstone is very-fine grained to fine-grained and contains regular narrow bands that are calcite-cemented and more resistant to weathering, giving it a characteristic banded appearance at outcrop, such as in the cliffs between West Bay and Burton Bradstock in Dorset. It is named for Bridport and has previously been known as the Midford Sand(s), Cotteswold Sands, Yeovil Sands and Upper Lias Sand(s). It forms a locally important aquifer, particularly around Yeovil. It forms one of the reservoir units in the Wytch Farm oilfield in Dorset.

== Extent and thickness ==
The Bridport Sand Formation is known from exposures in Dorset, Somerset and Gloucestershire and from the subsurface in numerous boreholes. It is also present offshore in the Portland–South Wight Basin, a sub-basin of the Wessex Basin. It reaches a maximum thickness of over 135 m in the Kimmeridge-3 well, in the onshore part of the Portland–South Wight sub-basin. It thins northwards from Dorset onto the Mendips axis, where it is missing. It reappears to the north of the axis.

== Lithology ==
The formation shows significant lateral variations in lithology. Three separate facies have been recognised; the Bridport Sands, the ferruginous (iron-rich) facies and the calcareous facies. The Bridport Sands facies consists of very-fine to fine-grained sandstones. They vary in colour from light grey to yellowish grey and contain varying amounts of silt and clay grade material. They are locally glauconitic and often calcareous. This facies is found in the main part of the Wessex Basin where the formation is at its thickest. The ferruginous facies consists of limestones cemented with goethite, ferroan calcite and dolomite. This facies is developed in the thinner sequence to the northeast of the Wessex Basin interbedded with the Bridport Sands facies. The calcareous facies consists of interbedded sandy limestones and very fine-grained sandstones, with some interbeds of calcareous claystones and siltstones. This facies is best developed to the east and south of the Portland–South Wight sub-basin. In the Wessex Basin, the lowest 21 metres are recognised as the Down Cliff Clay Member, which consists of "uniform blue-grey fine sandy clay that weathers to a yellowish clay".
