= Fulgoridiidae =

Fulgoridiidae Temporal range: Jurassic–Cenomanian

Scientific classification
- Kingdom: Animalia
- Phylum: Arthropoda
- Class: Insecta
- Order: Hemiptera
- Suborder: Auchenorrhyncha
- Infraorder: Fulgoromorpha
- Superfamily: Fulgoroidea
- Family: †Fulgoridiidae; Handlirsch 1939

Genera
- See text

Extinct family of true bugs

Fulgoridiidae are an extinct family of Mesozoic planthoppers. They are the earliest group of planthoppers known, and appear to be a paraphyletic assemblage ancestral to living planthoppers. The majority of known members of the family lived in the Jurassic period, though the group also includes one Cretaceous taxon. All currently known species are from Eurasia.

== Taxonomy ==
- †Aulieezidium Szwedo 2009 Karabastau Formation, Kazakhstan, Oxfordian
- †Cixiites Handlirsch 1906 Green Series, Germany, Toarcian
- †Compactofulgoridium Bode 1953 Posidonia Shale, Germany, Toarcian
- †Conofulgoridium Bode 1953 Posidonia Shale, Germany, Toarcian
- †Elasmoscelidium Martynov 1926 Posidonia Shale, Germany, Toarcian Karabastau Formation, Kazakhstan, Oxfordian
- †Eofulgoridium Martynov 1937 Kyzyl-Kiya, Kyrgyzstan, Pliensbachian, Sangonghe Formation, China, Toarcian
- †Elasmoscelidium Martynov 1926 Posidonia Shale, Germany, Toarcian Karabastau Formation, Kazakhstan, Oxfordian
- †Fenghuangor Li and Szwedo 2011 Daohugou, China, Callovian
- †Fulgoridiella Becker-Migdisova 1962 Dzhil Formation, Kyrgyzstan, Hettangian
- †Fulgoridium Handlirsch 1906 Posidonia Shale, Green Series, Germany, Toarcian
- †Fulgoridulum Handlirsch 1939 Posidonia Shale, Green Series, Germany, Toarcian, Beacon Limestone Formation, United Kingdom, Toarcian
- †Fulgoropsis Martynov 1937 Kyzyl-Kiya, Kyrgyzstan, Pliensbachian
- †Margaroptilon Handlirsch 1906 Posidonia Shale, Green Series, Germany, Toarcian, Whitby Mudstone, United Kingdom, Toarcian
- †"Mesocixiella" fennahi Whalley 1985 Charmouth Mudstone Formation, United Kingdom, Sinemurian
- †Metafulgoridium Handlirsch 1939 Posidonia Shale, Green Series, Germany, Toarcian
- †Parafulgoridium Handlirsch 1939 Green Series, Germany, Toarcian
- †Procerofulgoridium Bode 1953 Posidonia Shale, Germany, Toarcian
- †Productofulgoridium Bode 1953 Posidonia Shale, Germany, Toarcian
- †Stonymetopus Poinar, Brown & Bourgoin 2022 Burmese amber, Myanmar, Cretaceous (Albian or Cenomanian)
- †Tetrafulgoria Doweld 2013 (= Tetragonidium Bode 1953) Posidonia Shale, Germany, Toarcian
- †Valvifulgoria Lin 1986 Shiti Formation, China, Bajocian
