= Lias Group =

Sequence of rock strata found in a large area of western Europe

System	Series	Stage	Age (Ma)	European lithostratigraphy
Jurassic	Lower	Hettangian	younger	Lias
Triassic	Upper	Rhaetian	201.4–208.5	Lias
Triassic	Upper	Rhaetian	201.4–208.5	Keuper
Triassic	Upper	Norian	208.5–227.0	Keuper
Triassic	Upper	Carnian	227.0–237.0	Keuper
Triassic	Middle	Ladinian	237.0–242.0	Keuper
Triassic	Middle	Ladinian	237.0–242.0	Muschelkalk
Triassic	Middle	Anisian	242.0–247.2	Muschelkalk
Triassic	Middle	Anisian	242.0–247.2	Bunter or Buntsandstein
Triassic	Lower	Olenekian	247.2–251.2	Bunter or Buntsandstein
Triassic	Lower	Induan	251.2–251.9	Bunter or Buntsandstein
Permian	Lopingian	Changhsingian	older	Bunter or Buntsandstein
Permian	Lopingian	Changhsingian	older	Zechstein
Major lithostratigraphic units of northwest Europe with the ICS's geologic timescale of the Triassic.

The Lias Group or Lias is a lithostratigraphic unit (a sequence of rock strata) found in a large area of western Europe, including the British Isles, the North Sea, the Low Countries and the north of Germany. It consists of marine limestones, shales, marls and clays.

Lias is a Middle English term for hard limestone, used in this specific sense by geologists since 1833. In the past, geologists used Lias not only for the sequence of rock layers, but also for the timespan during which they were formed. It was thus an alternative name for the Early Jurassic epoch of the geologic timescale. It is now more specifically known that the Lias is Rhaetian to Toarcian in age (over a period of c. 20 million years between 200 to 180 million years ago) and thus also includes a part of the Triassic. The use of the name "Lias" for a unit of time is therefore slowly disappearing.

== Subdivisions ==
In southern England, the Lias Group is often divided into Lower, Middle and Upper subgroups. In Southern England the Lias is divided into the following formations (from top to base):

- Bridport Sand
- Beacon Limestone
- Dyrham Formation
- Charmouth Mudstone
- Blue Lias

In the East Midlands Shelf the Lias is divided into the following formations (from top to base):

- Whitby Mudstone
- Marlstone Rock
- Charmouth Mudstone
- Scunthorpe Mudstone

In the Cleveland Basin in Yorkshire the Lias is divided into the following formations (from top to base):

- Whitby Mudstone
- Cleveland Ironstone
- Staithes Sandstone
- Redcar Mudstone

In South Wales only the Blue Lias is present.

The Lias is underlain by the Late Triassic Penarth Group, and overlain by the Inferior Oolite in most of England and the Dogger Formation or Ravenscar Group in the Cleveland Basin. In some areas there is a stratigraphic hiatus, and the rocks are overlain by Cretaceous marine sediments.

There are restricted outcrops of Lias rocks on the west coast of Scotland where, in the Sea of the Hebrides depositional basin on Skye, Raasay and Mull, the Broadford Beds Formation, Pabay Shale Formation and overlying Scalpay Sandstone Formation are assigned to the Lias Group.

In Dutch lithostratigraphy, the name Lias has no official status, however, it is often used for the lower part of the Altena Group in the subsurface of the Netherlands and the southern North Sea.

In northern Germany, the Lias Group consists of nine formations (from top to base):

- Opalinuston
- Dörnten-Formation
- Posidonia Shale
- Amaltheenton
- Capricorn Formation
- Raricostaten-Formation
- Arieten Sandstone
- Liassicus Sandstone
- Psilonoten Sandstone

== See also ==
- Blue Lias
- White lias
