= Priscaenigma =

Priscaenigma Temporal range: Jurassic

Scientific classification
- Kingdom: Animalia
- Phylum: Arthropoda
- Class: Insecta
- Order: Raphidioptera
- Family: †Priscaenigmatidae
- Genus: †Priscaenigma
- Species: †P. obtusa

Binomial name
- †Priscaenigma obtusa Whalley, 1985

Extinct genus of insects

Priscaenigma is an extinct genus of snakefly of the Priscaenigmatidae family which was described by Whalley in 1985. The fossils were found on flatstones at Black Ven in Charmouth, Dorset at 50.7°N 2.9°W in a marine environment of the Charmouth Mudstone Formation. The fossils were collected by J. F. Jackson between 1961 and 1963. Its sister taxa is Hondelagia. The genus contains one species, the extinct Priscaenigma obtusa, also described by Whalley in 1985. Its forewing is 12.6 centimetres (5.0 in) in length. Only a forewing was found when the species was discovered.
