= Hondelagia =

Hondelagia Temporal range: Early Jurassic

Scientific classification
- Domain: Eukaryota
- Kingdom: Animalia
- Phylum: Arthropoda
- Class: Insecta
- Order: Raphidioptera
- Family: †Priscaenigmatidae
- Genus: †Hondelagia
- Species: †H. reticulata

Binomial name
- †Hondelagia reticulata (Bode) 1953

Extinct genus of insects

Hondelagia is an extinct genus of snakefly in the Priscaenigmatidae family. The genus has been described three times under the same taxonomy, but was initially described by A. Bode in 1953. It currently contains one species, the Hondelagia reticulata which was described by Bode in 1953. Its wing is 7 centimetres (2.8 in) in length and 3 centimetres (1.2 in) in width. It was found in Hondelage in Braunschweig. The genus was later described in 1992 by F. M. Carpenter and in 2002 by M. S. Engel. The genus' sister taxa is the extinct Priscaenigma. The species has no sister taxa.
