= Marlstone Rock Formation =

English Early Jurassic geological formation with ironstone

- Stratigraphic range: Pliensbachian–Toarcian
- Type: Geological formation
- Unit of: Lias Group
- Underlies: Whitby Mudstone Formation
- Overlies: Dyrham Formation, Charmouth Mudstone Formation (East Midlands Shelf northwards)
- Thickness: 10 metres (33 ft)

Lithology
- Primary: Limestone, sandstone
- Other: Mudstone, Ironstone

Location
- Country: United Kingdom
- Extent: East Midlands Shelf and Worcester Basin (Mendips to Market Weighton).

Type section
- Location: Jeffries Brickworks, near Stonehouse

The Marlstone Rock Formation is a geological formation in England. It dates to the Early Jurassic, it consists of "Sandy, shell-fragmental and ooidal ferruginous limestone interbedded with ferruginous calcareous sandstone, and generally subordinate ferruginous mudstone beds", with ironstone.
