= Alderton Hill Quarry =

Quarry in Gloucestershire, England

- Site of Special Scientific Interest
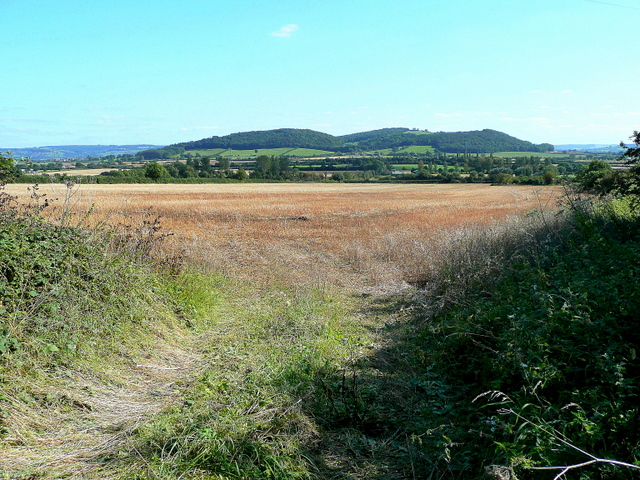
- The location - Alderton Hill
- Location of Alderton Hill Quarry.
- Area of search: Gloucestershire
- Grid reference: SP006345
- Coordinates: 52.009382°N 1.991941°W
- Interest: Geological
- Area: 0.34 hectare
- Notification date: 1997

Alderton Hill Quarry (grid reference SP006345) is a 0.34-hectare (0.84-acre) geological Site of Special Scientific Interest in Gloucestershire, notified in 1997. It is a Geological Conservation Review (GCR) site.

== Location and geology ==
The site is located on Alderton Hill to the south west of Dumbleton Wood, approximately 2 kilometres south west of Dumbleton village which is in north Gloucestershire.

The site is a significant location for research because of its well preserved Lower Jurassic insect fauna. There is a range of publications which detail the findings on this site, which include fossil insects. Particular findings are specimens of dragonflies (Gomphites) and a large cockroach. Fish remains have been found, and well-preserved cephalopods. The strata exposed are part of the Whitby Mudstone. In April 2024, Swaby et al. published the first comprehensive taxonomic and taphonomic analysis of the entire insect assemblage from Alderton Hill, based on all known museum specimens. Through comparison with the Lower Jurassic insect fauna of Strawberry Bank, Ilminster, Somerset, this study concluded that the Alderton Hill palaeoentomofauna is the best-preserved and most representative insect assemblage from the Toarcian strata of the UK.

The site is located in hedges which are species-rich. They include ash, oak, holly, hawthorn, hazel and spindle. The common blue butterfly is recorded.

== SSSI Source ==
- Natural England SSSI information on the citation
- Natural England SSSI information on the Alderton Hill Quarry unit
