= Redcar Mudstone Formation =

Geological formation in North Yorkshire, England

- Stratigraphic range: Hettangian-Pliensbachian; ~201–189 Ma
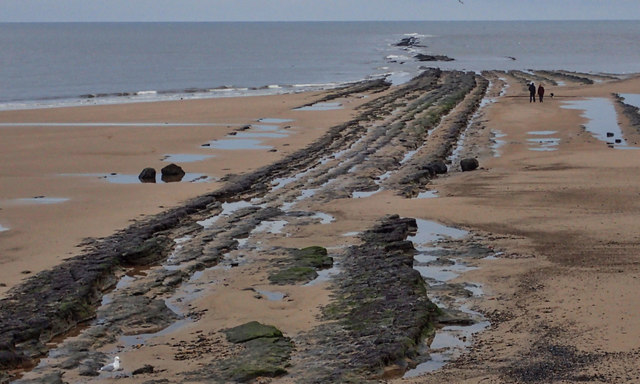
- Redcar Rocks exposed near Redcar, Yorkshire
- Type: Geological formation
- Unit of: Lias Group
- Underlies: Staithes Sandstone Formation
- Overlies: Lilstock Formation
- Thickness: up to 283 metres (930 ft)

Lithology
- Primary: Mudstone, siltstone
- Other: Sandstone, limestone

Location
- Coordinates: 54.6°N 1.1°W
- Approximate paleocoordinates: 41.1°N 2.3°E
- Region: North Yorkshire
- Country: United Kingdom
- Extent: Cleveland Basin

Type section
- Named for: Redcar
- Redcar Mudstone Formation (the United Kingdom) Redcar Mudstone Formation (North Yorkshire)

The Redcar Mudstone Formation is a geological formation in North Yorkshire, England. Part of the Lias Group, it was deposited in the Hettangian to Pliensbachian stages of the Early Jurassic. The lithology consists of fissile mudstones and siltstones, with the lower part having thin beds of limestone and the upper part having thin beds of sandstone. The Redcar Mudstone Formation at Wine Haven, Robin Hood's Bay, Yorkshire contains the Global Boundary Stratotype Section and Point (GSSP) for the base of the Pliensbachian.
