= Hondelage =

- Borough of Braunschweig
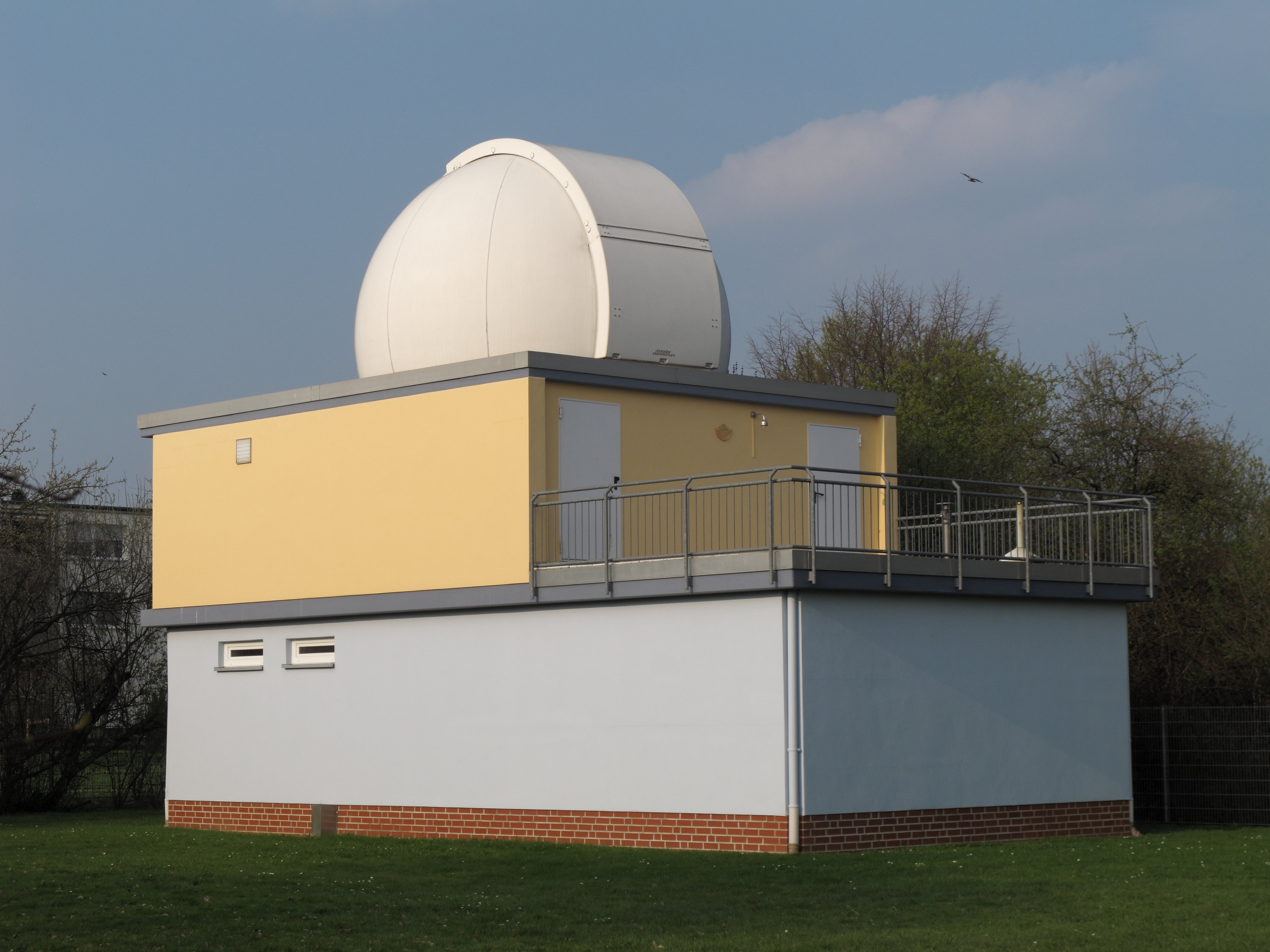
- Hondelage observatory

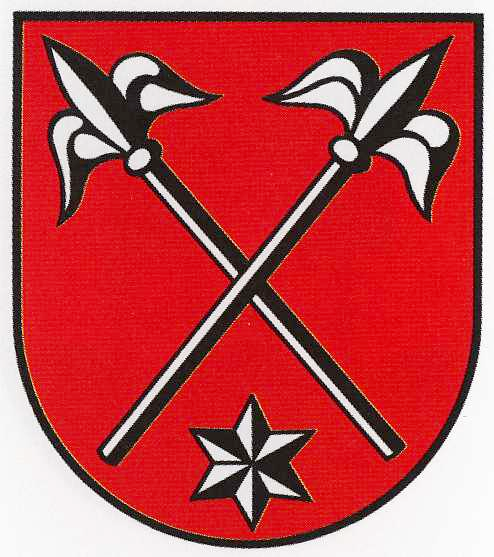
- Coat of arms

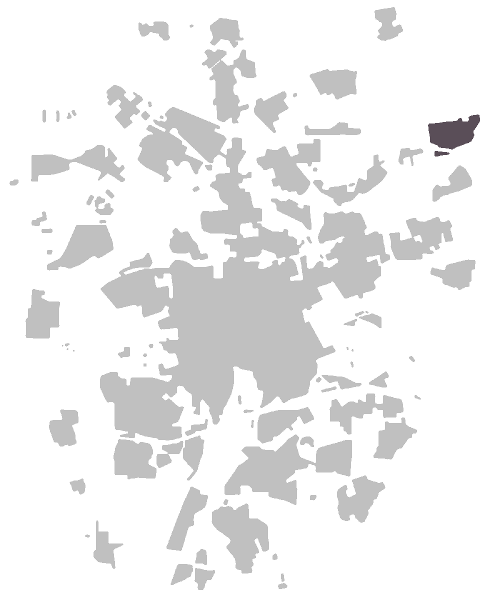
- Location of Hondelage within Braunschweig
- Interactive map of Hondelage
- Location within Germany Location within Lower Saxony
- Coordinates: 52°18′52″N 10°36′15″E
- Country: Germany
- State: Lower Saxony
- District: urban district
- City: Braunschweig

Government
  - Mayor: Jörg Gille (SPD)

Area
  - Total: 8.664 km^{2} (3.345 sq mi)

Population (2020-12-31)
  - Total: 3,765
  - Density: 434.6/km^{2} (1,125/sq mi)
- Time zone: UTC+01:00 (CET)
  - Summer (DST): UTC+02:00 (CEST)
- Postal codes: 38108
- Dialling codes: 05309
- Vehicle registration: BS

Hondelage (German pronunciation: [ˈhɔndəlaːɡə]) is a Stadtbezirk (borough) on the river Schunter in the north-eastern part of Braunschweig, Germany.

== History ==
The village of Hondelage was first mentioned in documents in 1179. During the early 16th century, the farming village became property of the Imperial abbey Riddagshausen. In 1974, Hondelage, until then part of the disbanded rural district of Braunschweig, was incorporated into the city of Braunschweig and became a city district.

Numerous fossils have been found in the Posidonia Shale of Hondelage, including Ichthyosaurus and Steneosaurus. Hondelagia, an extinct genus of snakefly, is named after Hondelage, the only place it has been found so far.

== Politics ==
The district mayor Jörg Gille is a member of the Social Democratic Party of Germany.
