= Whitby Mudstone =

Geological formation in Yorkshire, England

- Stratigraphic range: Toarcian (Falciferum-Bifrons); ~183–176 Ma
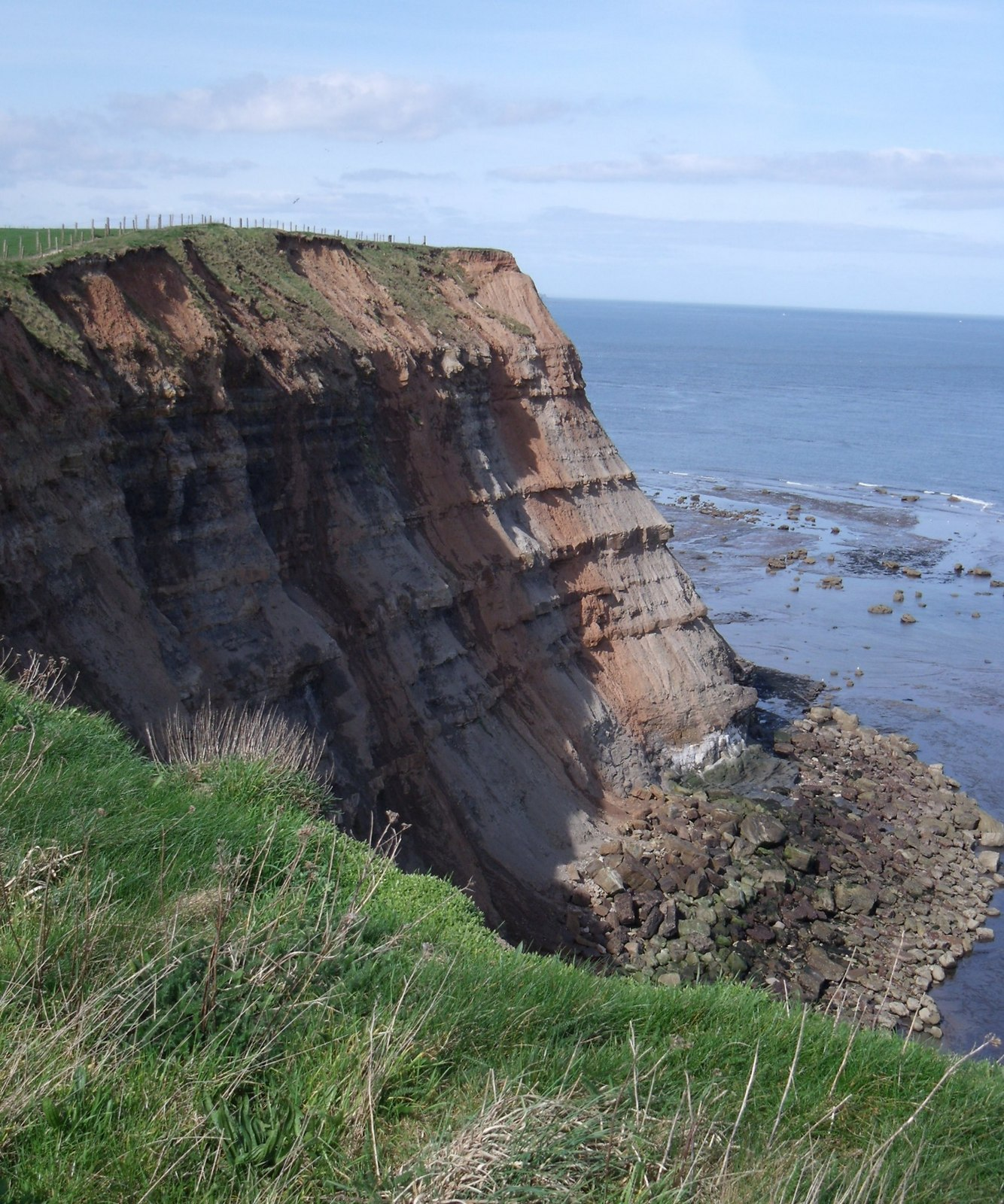
- East Cliff near Whitby
- Type: Geological formation
- Unit of: Lias Group
- Sub-units: Members: Fox Cliff Siltstone; Peak Mudstone; Alum Shale (Note: Not to be confused with the Ordovician Alum Shale Lagerstätte of Sweden); Mulgrave Shale; Grey Shale
- Underlies: Inferior Oolite or Ravenscar Groups; Or Blea Wyke, Dogger or Bridport Sand Formations
- Overlies: Marlstone Rock or Cleveland Ironstone Formations
- Thickness: Up to 120 m (390 ft)

Lithology
- Primary: Mudstone
- Other: Siltstone

Location
- Coordinates: 54.5°N 0.6°W
- Approximate paleocoordinates: 42.5°N 9.3°E
- Region: Yorkshire, Worcestershire
- Country: England
- Extent: Cleveland & Worcester Basins & East Midlands Shelf

Type section
- Named for: Whitby
- Location: Coastal exposures from Hawsker Bottoms to Whitby Harbour
- Whitby Mudstone (the United Kingdom) Whitby Mudstone (England)

The Whitby Mudstone is a Toarcian (Early Jurassic; Falciferum-Bifrons in regional chronostratigraphy) geological formation in Yorkshire and Worcestershire, England. The formation, part of the Lias Group, is present in the Cleveland and Worcester Basins and the East Midlands Shelf.

== Stratigraphy and lithologies ==
The formation consists of mudstone and siltstone, medium to dark grey in colour, with rare fine grained calcareous sandstone beds. Some of the beds are laminated and bituminous, limestone and phosphatic nodules are present at some levels. It is subdivided into five members. The oldest of these five members is the Grey Shale Member, the full sequence is

- Fox Cliff Siltstone Member
- Peak Mudstone Member
- Alum Shale Member
- Mulgrave Shale Member
- Grey Shale Member

The sediments were deposited during the Toarcian Oceanic Anoxic Event. The Alum Shale Member and the Jet Rock (which is the lowest of three long established informal divisions of the Mulgrave Shale Member) were both of economic importance during the 19th century.

=== Alum Shale Member ===
The Alum Shale Member was extensively quarried in the North Yorkshire area, it formed the basis of the alum industry in North Yorkshire.

It is a pyritic and unlaminated, bituminous, dark grey mudstone containing an abundant ammonite and bivalve fauna. The Alum Shale Member is the least silty part of the Whitby Mudstone Formation this, the low calcium carbonate content, and its pyritic nature, made it particularly useful for alum production. The 19th century miners used the presence of the bivalve Nuculana ovum to identify the strata suitable for making alum. Lewis Hunton, whose family were closely associated with the Yorkshire alum trade, noted in 1836 that "Failures have occurred to different works in attempting the calcination of the lower portions of the Upper Lias, or those strata undistinguished by the N. ovum" and “the lower strata having such an excess of pyrites and bitumen, that the contents of a kiln made from such schistus, invariably overroasts”.

=== Mulgrave Shale Member ===
The Mulgrave Shale Member directly underlies Alum Shale, it too is pyritic and it is so bituminous that the freshly broken rock smells strongly of oil. Calcareous concretions are common, some pyrite-skinned, and these may contain ammonites such as Harpoceras falciferum, with rare specimens having oil in their chambers. Unlike the overlying or underlying units the shales are moderately to finely laminated, although the laminations are less well developed in the Bituminous Shale at the top of the sequence.

The "Jet Rock" is the lowest and oldest of three long established informal divisions of the Mulgrave Shale Member. Above that lies the Bituminous Shale and the Ovatum Band (named after the presence of Ovaticeras ovatum). The better quality "hard jet" which was used in the 19th century for Whitby jet jewellery and ornaments is derived from the "Jet Rock". The more brittle and less easily worked 'soft' jet was found in other parts of the Lower Jurassic succession and was particularly common in the Bituminous Shales of the Mulgrave Shale Member.

=== Depositional environment and anoxia ===
The Lower Jurassic was a time of fluctuating sea-levels and the eustatic sea level gradually rose during the Toarcian, reaching a peak of ~75 m above the Hettangian sea level (which was similar to the present-day sea level). During the latest part of the Toarcian, the sea level again dropped by several tens of metres. The contrasts between the fine-grained Whitby Mudstone sediments and the underlying Cleveland Ironstone Formation and Staithes Sandstone Formation, which have coarser grained sediments, reflect the greater distance from shore and deeper water caused by the Toarcian sea level rise.

The presence of ammonites throughout the Whitby Mudstone Formation and the overlying Blea Wyke Sandstone Formation indicates that fully marine conditions prevailed. However, evidence of oxygen depleted bottom waters in the Mulgrave Shale member is provided by the very restricted benthic fauna, abundance of pyrite, high levels of organic carbon and the strong lamination (suggesting very limited bioturbation). Further indications of anoxia are provided by the presence of finely preserved, commonly articulated vertebrates in the Mulgrave Shale and Alum Shale members, pointing to the absence of significant scavenging benthos.

The Jet Rock, near the bottom of the Alum Shale Member represents peak anoxic conditions and, above that, the overall changes in the facies through the Alum Shale Member (including a decrease in organic carbon content, less well developed laminations and the presence of benthic organisms such as the marker Nuculana ovum) indicate increasing bottom water oxygenation. Detailed geochemical measurements reinforce the field observations and provide evidence that the fluctuations in bottom water oxygen level during deposition of the Whitby Mudstone is one aspect of the global Toarcian Oceanic Anoxic Event.

The Mulgrave Shale Member is stratigraphically equivalent to the German posidonerschifer which consists of oil shales formed of fine-grained sediments and bituminous limestones in fine, alternating layers and was also deposited under strongly reducing conditions during the Toarcian oceanic anoxic event.

== Fossil content ==
Dinosaur remains are among the fossils that have been recovered from the formation, although none have yet been referred to a specific genus. One of the more notable discoveries is the skull of the pterosaur Parapsicephalus, found within the Alum Shale (Note: Not to be confused with the Ordovician Alum Shale Lagerstätte of Sweden) Member.

=== Vertebrates ===
Vertebrates of the Whitby Mudstone Formation
Genus	Species	Location	Stratigraphic position	Abundance	Notes	Images
cf. Campylognathoides	Indeterminate	Winterton	Falciferum Zone	NHMUK PV R 36712, Humerus	A pterosaur	
Gyrosteus	G. mirabilis	Whitby		Multiple partial skeletons	A large chondrosteid acipenseriform fish	
Hauffiosaurus	H. longirostris	Whitby-Saltwick	Falciferum Zone	MCZ 1033, a skeleton	A Pliosaurid	
Microcleidus	M. homalospondylus	Whitby	Upper Alum Shale, Hildoceras bifrons Zone	Multiple partial skeletons	Microcleidid plesiosaur	
Macrospondylus	M. bollensis		Harpoceras serpentinum Zone	Several partial skeletons	Teleosaurid	
Mystriosaurus	M. laurillardi	Whitby		Skull and lower jaws	Teleosaurid, formerly considered to be the holotype of "Steneosaurus" brevior	
Parapsicephalus	P. purdoni	Loftus Alum Shale Quarry, Saltwick Bay (referred material)	Upper Alum Shale Member	Single partial skull lacking the snout (GSM 3166), tentantive referral of a humerus and scapulocoracoid (NHMUK PV R36634).	A Rhamphorhynchid pterosaur	
Pelagosaurus	P. typus	Whitby	Alum Shale		Thalattosuchian	
Rhomaleosaurus	R. thorntoni	Kingsthorpe Hollow	Upper	NHMUK PV Rr4853, a single mostly complete skeleton	A Rhomaleosaurid	Rhomaleosaurus cramptoni holotype cast
Rhomaleosaurus	R. zetlandicus	Loftus (also Lofthouse) Alum Mine	Alum Shale Member	YORYM G503, a partial skeleton	A Rhomaleosaurid	Rhomaleosaurus cramptoni holotype cast
Rhomaleosaurus	R. cramptoni	Alum quarry, Kettleness		NMING F8785, a partial skeleton	A Rhomaleosaurid	Rhomaleosaurus cramptoni holotype cast
Plagiophthalmosuchus	P. gracilirostris	Whitby			Teleosaurid	
Stenopterygius	S. quadriscissus	Whitby			A stenopterygiid ichthyosaur	
Temnodontosaurus	Temodontosaurus sp.	Oakham		Full skeleton	Ichthyosaur	
?Theropoda	Indeterminate			Femur, currently lost		
Tetanurae	Indeterminate			Incomplete anterior dorsal vertebra	Originally referred to Streptospondylus cuvieri.	

=== Insects ===
Insect compression fossils are known from nodules found on Alderton Hill near Alderton and Dumbleton in Gloucestershire, including Alderton Hill Quarry and other nearby localities.

== See also ==
- List of fossiliferous stratigraphic units in England
- Toarcian turnover
- Toarcian formations

== Notes and references ==
=== Bibliography ===
- O'Sullivan, Michael; Martill, David M. (2017). "The taxonomy and systematics of Parapsicephalus purdoni (Reptilia: Pterosauria) from the Lower Jurassic Whitby Mudstone Formation, Whitby, U.K" (PDF). Historical Biology. 29 (8): 1009–1018. Bibcode:2017HBio...29.1009O. doi:10.1080/08912963.2017.1281919.
- Weishampel, David B.; Dodson, Peter; Osmólska, Halszka, eds. (2004). The Dinosauria (2nd ed.). Berkeley: University of California Press. pp. 1–880. ISBN 0-520-24209-2.
