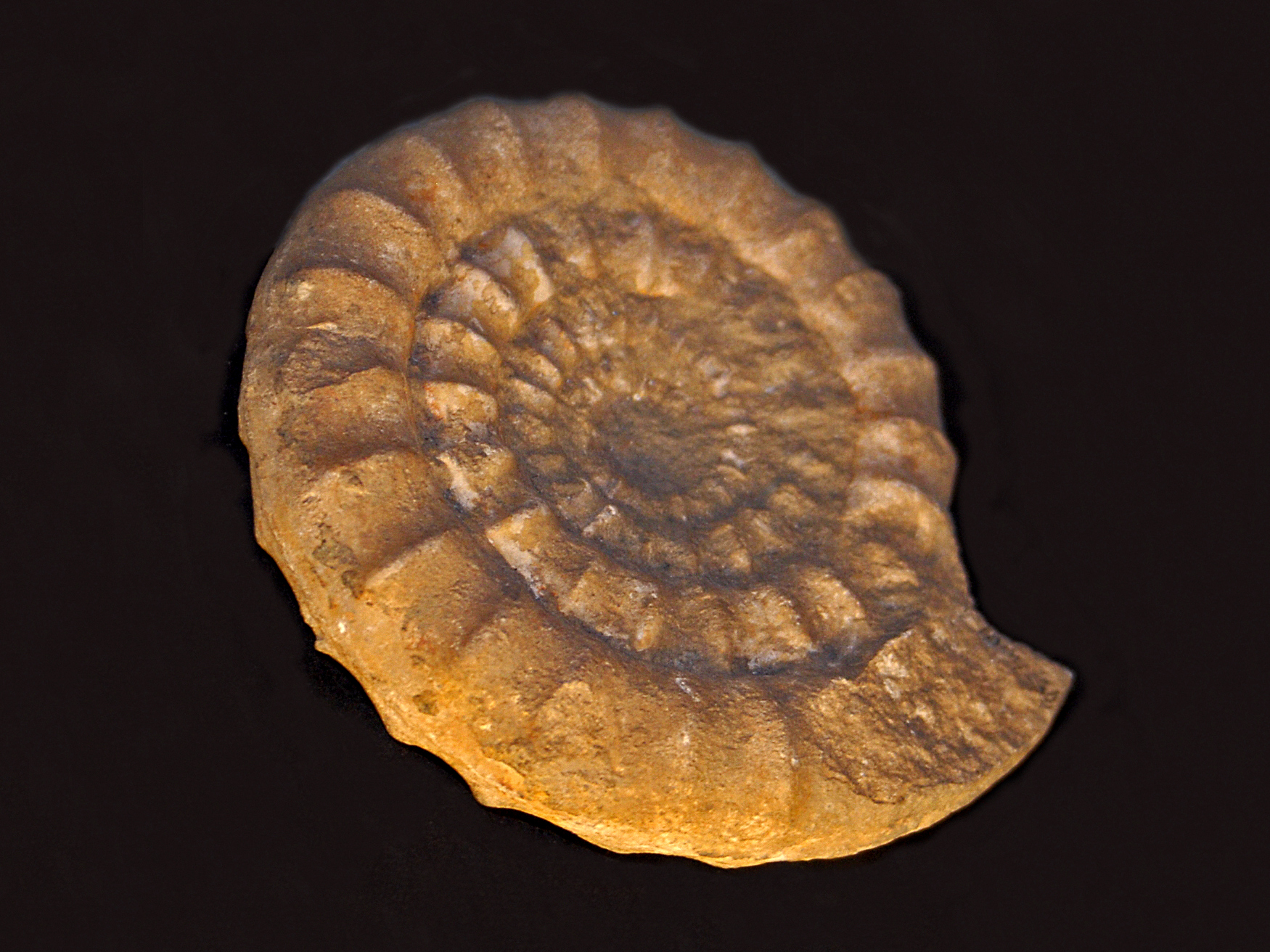
- Fossil shells of Echioceras raricostatum from Pierreclos (France), on display at Galerie de paléontologie et d'anatomie comparée in Paris

Scientific classification
- Kingdom: Animalia
- Phylum: Mollusca
- Class: Cephalopoda
- Subclass: †Ammonoidea
- Order: †Ammonitida
- Family: †Echioceratidae
- Genus: †Echioceras; Bayle, 1878

Species
- Echioceras delicatum Buckman, 1914; Echioceras intermedium Trueman and Williams, 1925; Echioceras raricostatum Zieten, 1831

= Echioceras =

Echioceras Temporal range: Sinemurian, 196.5–189.6 Ma

Genus of molluscs (fossil)

Echioceras is an extinct genus of ammonites from the Early Jurassic of Europe and North America.

== Description ==
Shell of Echioceras species can reach a diameter of about 4–6 centimetres (1.6–2.4 in).. The narrow and broad evolute shell is reinforced by fine ribs on inner whorls, progressively becoming stronger, straight and distinct.

== Distribution ==
Fossils of species within this genus have been found in the Jurassic rocks of Canada, Hong Kong, Turkey and United Kingdom, Carpathians and Alps.
