= Staithes Sandstone Formation =

- Stratigraphic range: Pliensbachian
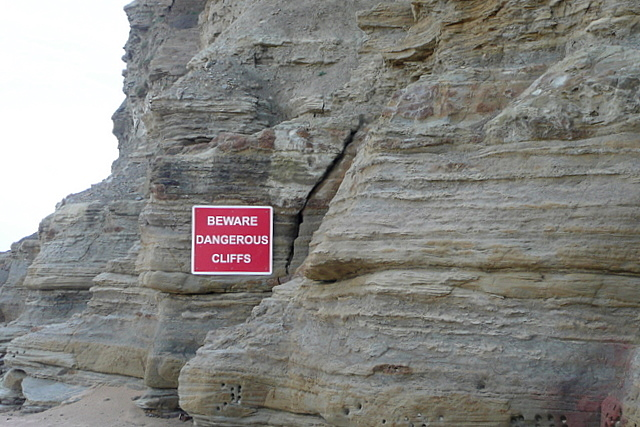
- Type: Geological formation
- Unit of: Lias Group
- Underlies: Cleveland Ironstone Formation
- Overlies: Redcar Mudstone Formation
- Area: Cleveland Basin
- Thickness: up to 30 metres (100 ft)

Lithology
- Primary: Sandstone

Location
- Region: Europe
- Country: United Kingdom
- Extent: North Yorkshire

Type section
- Named for: Staithes
- Location: Coastal exposures at Staithes harbour

The Staithes Sandstone Formation is a geological formation in North Yorkshire, England. Part of the Lias Group, it is Pliensbachian in age. The lithology consists of silty sandstones, with varying argillaceousness. Typically intensely bioturbated and with many bedding structures.
