= Acanthopleuroceras =

Acanthopleuroceras Temporal range: Pliensbachian

Scientific classification
- Kingdom: Animalia
- Phylum: Mollusca
- Class: Cephalopoda
- Subclass: †Ammonoidea
- Order: †Ammonitida
- Family: †Polymorphitidae
- Genus: †Acanthopleuroceras; Hyatt, 1900

Genus of molluscs (fossil)

Acanthopleuroceras is an extinct genus of cephalopod belonging to the Ammonite subclass.
