= Agkistracanthus =

Agkistracanthus Temporal range: Rhaetian –Hettangian

Scientific classification
- Kingdom: Animalia
- Phylum: Chordata
- Class: Chondrichthyes
- Subclass: Holocephali
- Order: Chimaeriformes
- Family: †Myriacanthidae
- Genus: †Agkistracanthus; Duffin & Furrer, 1981

Extinct genus of cartilaginous fishes

Agkistracanthus is an extinct genus of holocephalan cartilaginous fish from the Mesozoic era. It currently contains a single species, A. mitgelensis. It is known from the Rhaetian to Hettangian epochs, spanning the transition from the Triassic to Jurassic period. Fossils from this genus are known from Switzerland, Austria, and Britain. It is known mostly from isolated and fragmentary material, including fin spines as well as palatine, symphyseal, and mandibular structures.
