= Thorncombe Beacon =

Hill in Dorset, England

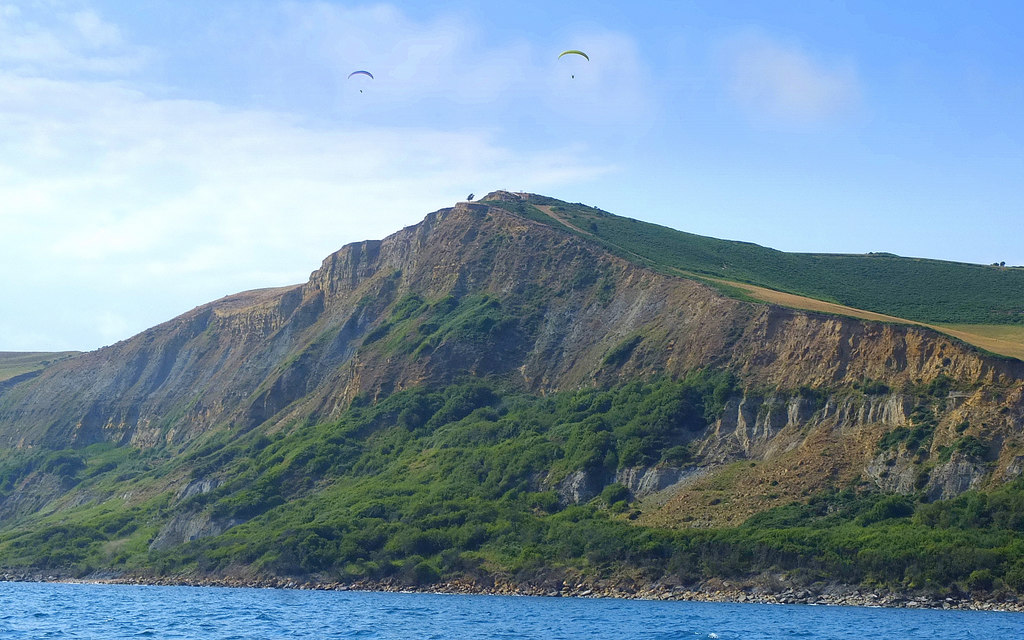
- Thorncombe Beacon from Great Ebb

Highest point
- Elevation: 157 metres (515 ft)
- Coordinates: 50.7200°N 2.8013°W

Geography
- Location within Dorset
- Country: United Kingdom
- State: Dorset
- Settlement: Symondsbury
- OS grid: SY437913

Thorncombe Beacon is a hill between Bridport and Charmouth in Dorset, England. It lies about 1 kilometre (0.62 mi) west of Eype Mouth and 2 kilometres (1.2 mi) east of Seatown. It is in the south-west part of Symondsbury parish close to the parish of Chideock. It is 157 metres (515 ft) high, compared to 191 metres (627 ft) for Golden Cap which lies about 3 kilometres (1.9 mi) to the west. It forms part of the Jurassic Coast, a World Heritage Site and the South West Coast Path and the Monarch's Way skirt the hilltop.

The hill is owned by the National Trust. Three bowl barrows to the north-east of the summit constitute a scheduled monument.
