= Penarth Group =

Rhaetian age (Triassic) rock strata sequence

- Stratigraphic range: Rhaetian
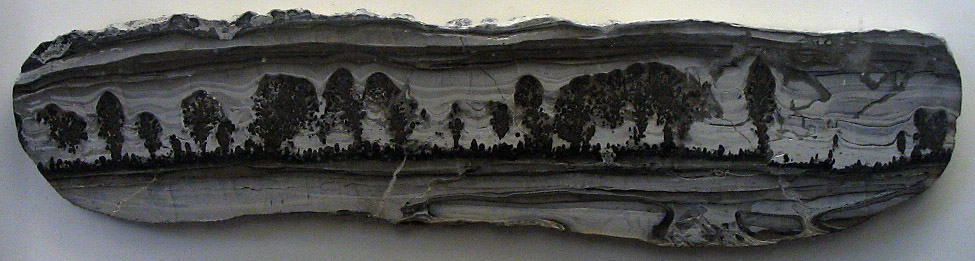
- Cut face of Cotham Marble, from the Lilstock Formation, showing the stromatolitic structures resembling a landscape
- Type: Group
- Sub-units: Westbury Formation, Lilstock Formation
- Underlies: Lias Group
- Overlies: Mercia Mudstone Group
- Thickness: from 0 to more than 12m

Lithology
- Primary: mudstone
- Other: limestone, sandstone

Location
- Country: Great Britain, Ireland
- Extent: widespread

Type section
- Named for: Penarth

The Penarth Group is a Rhaetian age (Triassic) lithostratigraphic group (a sequence of rock strata) which is widespread in Britain. It is named from the seaside town of Penarth near Cardiff in south Wales where strata of this age are exposed in coastal cliffs southwards to Lavernock Point. This sequence of rocks was previously known as the Rhaetic or Rhaetic Beds.

== Stratigraphy ==
It includes the Lilstock Formation and the underlying Westbury Formation. The Langport and Cotham Members, grey limestones of marine origin with associated mudstones, are recognised within the Lilstock Formation, itself named from Lilstock in west Somerset. The Westbury Formation is named from Westbury-on-Severn in Gloucestershire.

== Ireland ==
In 1999, the discovery of an ichthyosaur from Langport Member mudstones exposed at Waterloo Bay, Larne, provided the most complete example of this in Northern Ireland.
