= Lilstock Formation =

Geologial formation in England, UK

- Stratigraphic range: Rhaetian; ~205–202 Ma
- Type: Formation
- Unit of: Penarth Group
- Sub-units: Cotham Member, Langport Member
- Underlies: Blue Lias Formation, Scunthorpe Mudstone Redcar Mudstone Formation
- Overlies: Westbury Formation
- Thickness: 1–10 m (3.3–32.8 ft)

Lithology
- Primary: Shale, siltstone, limestone, mudstone

Location
- Coordinates: 51.2°N 3.3°W
- Approximate paleocoordinates: 35.5°N 0.5°E
- Region: England
- Country: United Kingdom

Type section
- Named for: Lilstock
- Lilstock Formation (the United Kingdom) Lilstock Formation (England)

The Lilstock Formation is a geologic formation in England. It preserves bivalve, insect and other invertebrate fossils, as well as fossil fish of Agkistracanthus mitgelensis and the basal theropod dinosaur Newtonsaurus cambrensis dating back to the Rhaetian of the Triassic period.

== White Lias ==
The White lias is a rare, fine-grained form of limestone from the late Triassic period, occurring only in certain parts of Somerset and infrequently in Warwickshire. It gets the name ‘lias’ from the quarrymen's dialect for ‘layers’, referring to its natural state when quarried.

White lias is part of the Langport Member of the Lilstock Formation, a multi-layered bed of stone formed from shale and limestone. At its base is a bone-bed yielding ancient marine, reptilian and ammonite fossils.

White lias varies in colour from white-cream to pale grey and is traditionally used for building and flooring. Evidence of its use can be seen in manor houses, churches and cathedrals all over the UK. It is most prevalent in the Somerset towns of Midsomer Norton, Radstock, Langport and Wincanton. Bowdens quarry in Langport is the only supplier of white lias, and of the more commonly found blue lias and grey varieties.

== Fossil content ==
Color key: Taxon / Reclassified taxon / Taxon falsely reported as present / Dubious taxon or junior synonym / Ichnotaxon / Ootaxon / Morphotaxon	Notes; Uncertain or tentative taxa are in small text; ~~crossed out~~ taxa are discredited.

=== Dinosaurs ===
==== Theropods ====
Theropods of the Lilstock Formation
Genus	Species	Location	Stratigraphic position	Material	Notes	Images
Newtonsaurus	N. cambrensis				A coelophysoid theropod	

=== Fish ===
==== Cartilaginous Fish ====
Cartilaginous Fish of the Lilstock Formation
Genus	Species	Location	Stratigraphic position	Material	Notes	Image
Agkistracanthus	A. mitgelensis				A myriacanthid chimaeriform	

== See also ==
- List of fossiliferous stratigraphic units in England
