= Wessex Basin =

Petroliferous geological area on the southern coast of England and the English Channel

Coordinates: 50°40′N 2°0′W

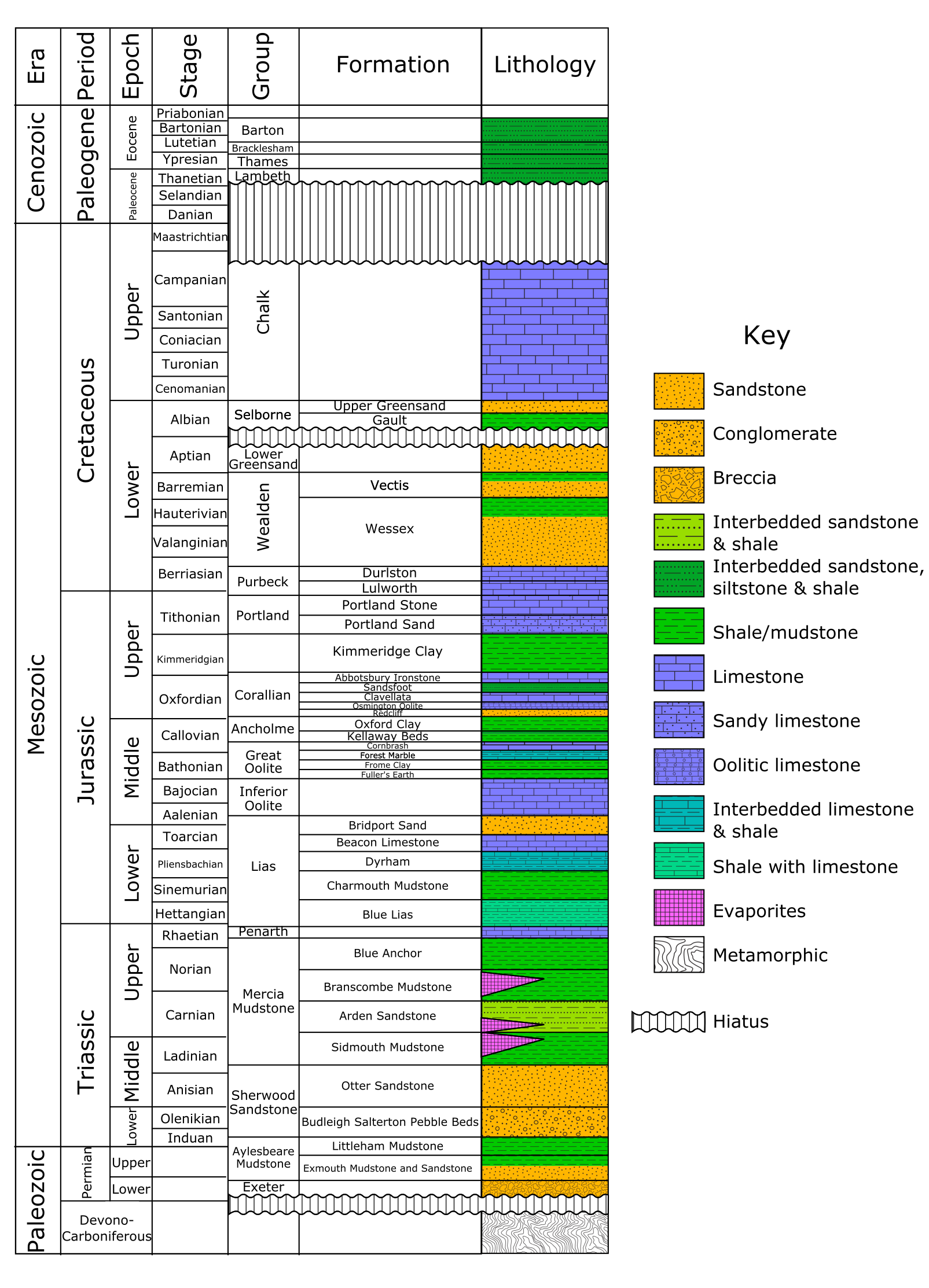
Lithostratigraphy of the Wessex Basin

The Wessex Basin is a petroleum-bearing geological area located along the southern coast of England and extending into the English Channel. The onshore part of the basin covers approximately 20,000 km^{2} and the area that encompasses the English Channel is of similar size. The basin is a rift basin that was created during the Permian to early Cretaceous in response to movement of the African plate relative to the Eurasian plate. In the late Cretaceous, and again in the Cenozoic, the basin was inverted as a distant effect of the Alpine orogeny. The basin is usually divided into 3 main sub-basins including the Winterborne-Kingston Trough, Channel Basin, and Vale of Pewsey Basin. The area is also rich in hydrocarbons with several offshore wells in the area. With the large interest in the hydrocarbon exploration of the area, data became more readily available, which improved the understanding of the type of inversion tectonics that characterize this basin.

== Tectonic mechanisms ==
Lithospheric thinning and crustal extension led to the subsidence and consequently the creation of asymmetric graben. These events happened in pulses starting in the Permian and concluding in the early Cretaceous period. By mid Cretaceous the active crustal extension ceased and the region underwent a period of unfaulted subsidence in part due to the thermal relaxation effects from the earlier lithospheric action. Inversion began starting in the late Cretaceous and carried on through Cenozoic times coinciding with the Alpine orogeny happening at the now convergent boundary of the African and Eurasian plates.

== Basement structure and stratigraphy ==
Starting at the basement of the structure, the area of interest overlies Variscan externides consisting of Devonian and Carboniferous sediments in imbricated thrust sheets. The Hercynian basement was rather thin in origin with the thrust emplacement in a north-northwest trend developed most likely with a strike-slip fault. After the conclusion of the initial Hercynian deformation, normal reactivation of these same faults occurred along with differential subsidence beginning in the late Carboniferous as a direct result from the northwest/southeast trending wrench movements. The sands created within this period lie in an unconformable manner above the Devonian and Carboniferous basement. The asymmetrical grabens are found within these sands and through the use of dating techniques mark the point in history of basin initiation during the late Carboniferous. Following this stage the basin underwent a period of erosion removing approximately 10 km of sediment from the area with the following Permian sediment deposition being dictated by the former Hercynian structure. This semi-arid, desert sedimentation occurred on the western portion of the basin with the clasts eventually thinning as they progress towards the east side of the basin. Triassic sediments sit unconformably above the Permian layer with the makeup being mainly sands and silts. Like the former stage, the Triassic sediments were first concentrated on the west side of the basin but also appeared in the southwest as a direct result from marine transgression. The Jurassic period followed with the same marine sedimentation, but by the end of the period, sea-level began to fall leaving behind shallow marine sediments. The Cretaceous period marks a major transition as the area became unstable with the basement faults reactivating and additional deposition of 1000m of brackish non-marine/freshwater sediments along with major uplift of the basin margins. The later Cretaceous consisted of deposition almost entirely of chalk with a basin wide unconformity delineating the period between the Paleogene and Late Cretaceous. These sediments are important as they represent the marker bed that show when the inversion of the basin began.

== Basin inversion ==
The basin's inversion mechanism can be traced back to the movements of the Alpine orogeny that resulted in a series of monoclines along the boundary faults and the uplift of pre-Cenozoic sediments. Inversion can happen along reactivated fault lines and in this case the faults involved are the Mesozoic extensional growth faults. The reverse movements of the extensional faults in response reactivated the basement faults but this time as thrust faults. Former structural highs underwent inversions to become areas where large amounts of sediments began being deposited, while also slowly deepening to the basement faults. The amount of deepening of a former high structure correlates directly with the amount of over thrusting.

In addition, there are several sediment depositional environments that also help catalog when and where initial basin inversion was happening. Basin erosion during the late Cretaceous and Paleogene is one of the first indicators, along with a regional change in the chalk composition to non-marine fluvial sediments. Major chalk fissures also became infilled with Paleocene sediments. There are east-west trending stylolites specifically in the Purbeck chalk formation that date the onset of the compression, the start of the inversion. Additionally, Eocene paleosols created during the late Cretaceous south of the Purbeck- Isle of Wight fault zone is a direct contrast of the marine sediments of the same age to the north.

Presently the basin is described with a series of east-west trending monoclines and anticlines that lie above the underlying Mesozoic growth faults. The Purbeck-Isle of Wight fault is one of the areas where inversion of the basin is distinctly seen with pre and post inversion structures.

== Hydrocarbons ==
Hydrocarbon exploration led to immense seismic profiling in the areas of South Dorset, Hampshire, and the Isle of Wight. The petroleum geology is primarily confined to the Mesozoic strata and were first drilled in 1937. The Kimmeridge Oil Field is an offshore field that was first discovered in the 1950s is the largest in the area and is still in production to this day. Wytch Farm is the major onshore field that entered production during the 1970s. This accumulation stems from three major source rocks known as the Blue Lias Formation with Liassic clays, the Oxford Clay Formation, and the Kimmeridge Clay Formation.

== See also ==
- East Midlands Oil Province
- Geology of Hampshire
- London Basin
- Petroleum reservoir
