= Archidermapteron =

Scientific classification
- Domain: Eukaryota
- Kingdom: Animalia
- Phylum: Arthropoda
- Class: Insecta
- Order: Dermaptera
- Family: †Protodiplatyidae
- Genus: †Archidermapteron; Vishnyakova, 1980
- Species: †A. martynovi

Binomial name
- †Archidermapteron martynovi Vishnyakova, 1980

Extinct species of earwig

Archidermapteron martynovi (Greek: archi=ancient, and dermaptera=skin-wing) is an extinct species of earwig, in the genus Archidermapteron, family Protodiplatyidae, the suborder Archidermaptera, the order Dermaptera, and is the only species in the genus Archidermapteron, which simply means "ancient member of the Dermaptera". It had long, segmented cerci unlike modern species of Dermaptera, but tegmina and hind wings that folded up into a "wing package" that are like modern earwigs. The only clear fossil of the species was found in Russia.

== Discovery ==
Little is known about how the species was discovered due to the ambiguity of the reports about it, and the fact that only one fossil was ever found. The reason for this is that the environment that most earwigs live in often prevents preservation, because dead organisms in soil and other crevices quickly rot and dissolve away. It is known, however, that the sole fossil of it was found in the early 1900s by a team of Russian entomologists. The species is named after Dr. Andrey Vasilyevich Martynov, an entomologist who conducted extensive studies of fossil insects in the Soviet Union and who in 1925 wrote a paper about its discovery.

== Characteristics ==
Unlike most extant earwigs in the Forficulina suborder, Archidermapteron martynovi had cerci, that were as long as its thorax and abdomen combined, or about 80% of the length of its body. This would have been longer than their antennae. By contrast, most male Common earwigs, Forficula auricularia, have cerci that are slightly less than the length of their abdomen, but in rare cases can reach lengths that are slightly longer. Common earwigs' cerci almost never reach lengths longer than their abdomen, let alone their abdomen and thorax combined.

The species' cerci themselves could be described as being more bead-like (filiform) than the thicker cerci, specifically known as forceps, of most other earwigs. One of the key characteristics of the Forficulina suborder is the existence of large, thick, basally broadened and crenulate-toothed forceps, which is notably absent on Archidermapteron martynovi. The only species of earwigs with these uncharacteristically thinner cerci are earwigs in the suborders Arixeniina and Hemimerina, which are rare and contain few individuals.

In order to open their wings, extant species of Forficulina use their cerci because their wings fold into a "package" due to internal elasticity. While Archidermapteron martynovi had such a wing package, they also had long segmented cerci, as mentioned above. This means that the unsegmented cerci of extant species of Forficulina is probably not an adaptation for wing folding. Instead, it is likely that the cerci of Archidermapteron martynovi served a function similar to that of an insect's antennae: touch.

== Phylogenesis ==
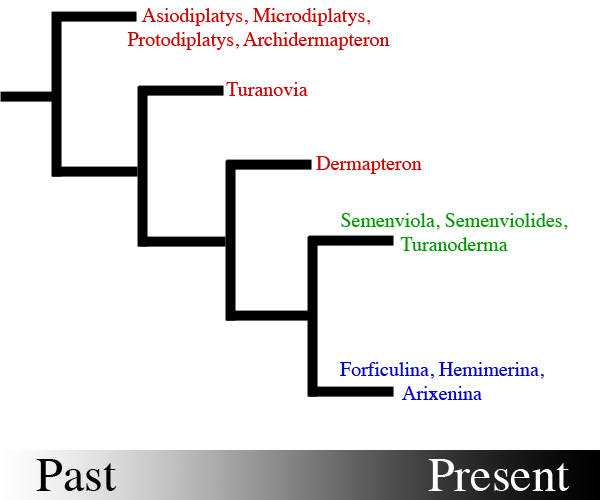
This chart shows Willmann's phylogenetic hypothesis for earwigs. Red are extinct genera in Archidermaptera, among them is Archidermapteron. Blue are the three living suborders of earwigs, except for green, which are the extinct genera in Forficulina.

According to the research of Dr. Fabian Hass, an entomologist who specializes in earwig biology, the relative age of this species compared to other genera in the suborder Archidermaptera can be approximated based upon the research of Dr. R. Willmann. According to Willmann, the genus Archidermapteron, and therefore also the species Archidermapteron martynovi, existed longer ago than the genera Dermapteron and Turanovia, but around the same time period as Asiodiplatys, Microdiplatys, and Protodiplatys. He bases this assumption on the shape of the fossils' cerci: Archidermateron, Asiodiplatys, Microdiplatys, and Protodiplatys all had cerci that were long and filiform, while Dermapteron had cerci that were short and more forcep-like. Therefore, Turanovia would have been in between both groups.

Willmann also discovered that Archidermaptera cannot be a monophyletic group, or a group consisting of an ancestor and all its descendants. The reasoning for this is that various genera in the suborder, such as Dermapteron, are more similar to the earwigs with forceps-like cerci than other genera, such as Turanovia, as mentioned above. This would imply that not all of the descendants of Archidermaptera are contained within the group Archidermaptera. In particular, the group Forficulina is descended from Archidermaptera, but is not included in Archidermaptera, but rather its own group. Therefore, Archidermaptera is not monophyletic, but instead paraphyletic, meaning that the group contains its most recent common ancestor, but does not contain all of the descendants of that ancestor.

However, this does not necessarily mean that Willmann's hypothesis is correct. According to Dr. V. N. Vishnyakova, in an article written by her in the Paleontological Journal, Willmann could be correct on some fronts, but wrong on others. Although Vishnyakova did not address Willmann specifically (she wrote about it ten years earlier), her paper disagrees with Willmann's on the basis of the ordering of Semenviola, Semenoviolides, and Turanoderma, which are extinct genera in Forficulina. Mainstream science is still unsure of whose chart is more accurate: it all depends on the definitions of certain taxon, which can change from person to person.
