= Holubice =

Holubice may refer to:

- Holubice (Prague-West District), a municipality and village in the Central Bohemian Region, Czech Republic
- Holubice (Vyškov District), a municipality and village in the South Moravian Region, Czech Republic
- Holubice, a village and part of Ptení in the Olomouc Region, Czech Republic
- Holubice (film) or The White Dove, a 1960 Czechoslovak film
