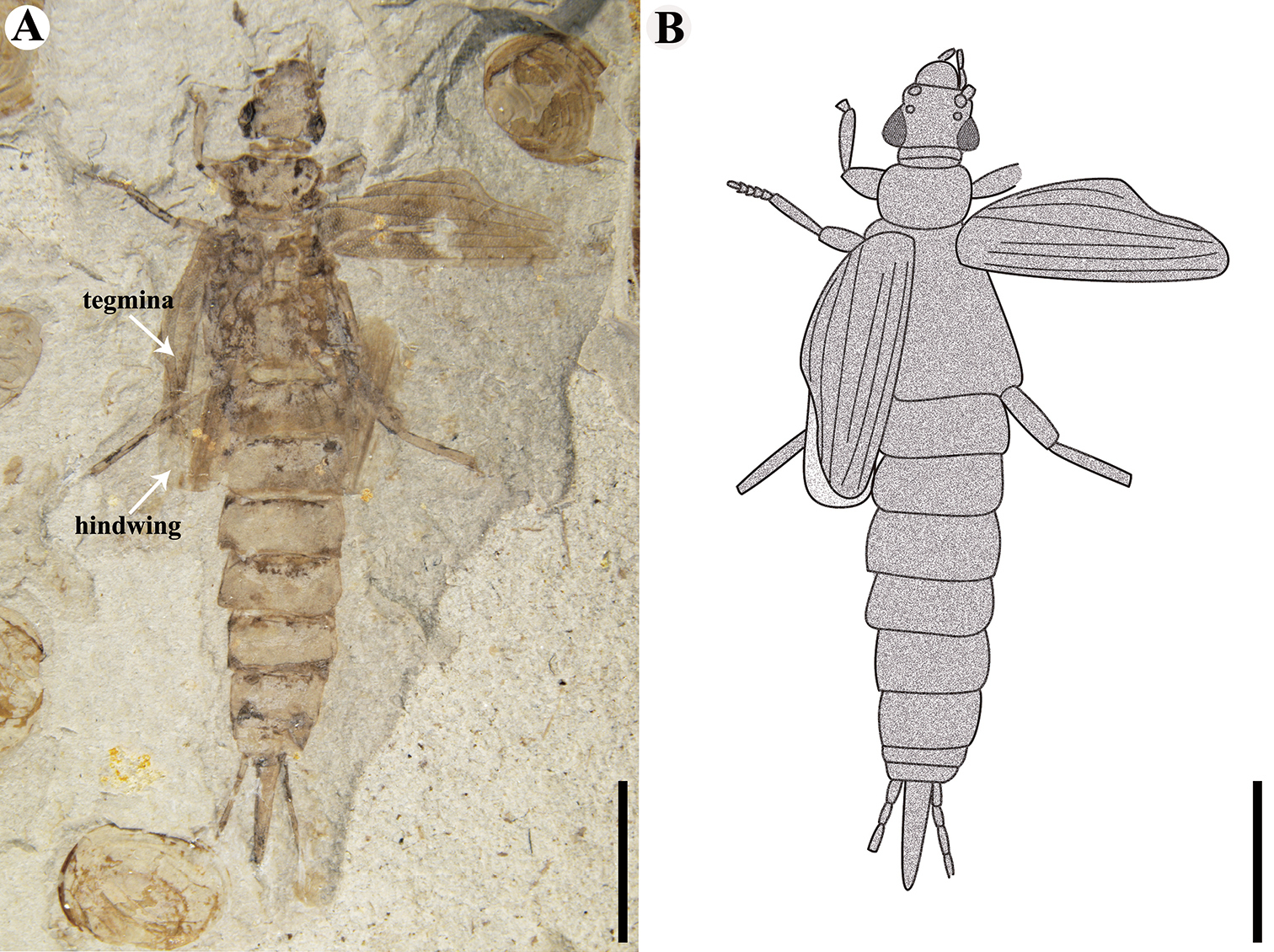
- Sinopalaeodermata concavum

Scientific classification
- Domain: Eukaryota
- Kingdom: Animalia
- Phylum: Arthropoda
- Class: Insecta
- Order: Dermaptera
- Suborder: †Archidermaptera
- Family: †Dermapteridae; Vishnyakova, 1980

Genera
- See text

Synonyms
- Sinopalaeodermatidae Zhang, 2002

= Dermapteridae =

Dermapteridae Temporal range: Norian–Barremian

Extinct family of earwigs

Dermapteridae is an extinct family of earwigs known from the Late Triassic to Mid Cretaceous, it is part of the extinct suborder Archidermaptera, alongside Protodiplatyidae and Turanovia. It was first named as a subfamily by Vishniakova in 1980, and elevated to family status by Engel in 2003 without discussion.

== Systematics ==
- †Brevicula Whalley, 1985 Charmouth Mudstone Formation, United Kingdom, Early Jurassic (Sinemurian)
- †Dacryoderma Engel, 2021 Charmouth Mudstone Formation, United Kingdom, Sinemurian
- †Dermapteron Martynov, 1925 Karabastau Formation, Kazakhstan, Middle-Late Jurassic (Callovian/Oxfordian)
- †Dimapteron Kelly et al. 2018 Durlston Formation, United Kingdom, Early Cretaceous (Berriasian)
- †Jurassimedeola Zhang, 2002 Daohugou, China, Callovian
- †Palaeodermapteron Zhao et al. 2011 Daohugou, China, Callovian
- †Phanerogramma Cockerell, 1915 Blackstone Formation, Australia, Late Triassic (Norian) Westbury Formation, Lilstock Formation, United Kingdom, Late Triassic (Rhaetian), Blue Lias, United Kingdom, Early Jurassic (Hettangian)
- †Sinopalaeodermata Zhang, 2002 Daohugou, China, Callovian
- †Trivenapteron Kelly et al. 2018 Beacon Limestone Formation, United Kingdom, Early Jurassic (Toarcian)
- †Valdopteron Kelly et al. 2018 Weald Clay Formation, United Kingdom, Early Cretaceous (Barremian)
