= Srnojedy =

- Municipality
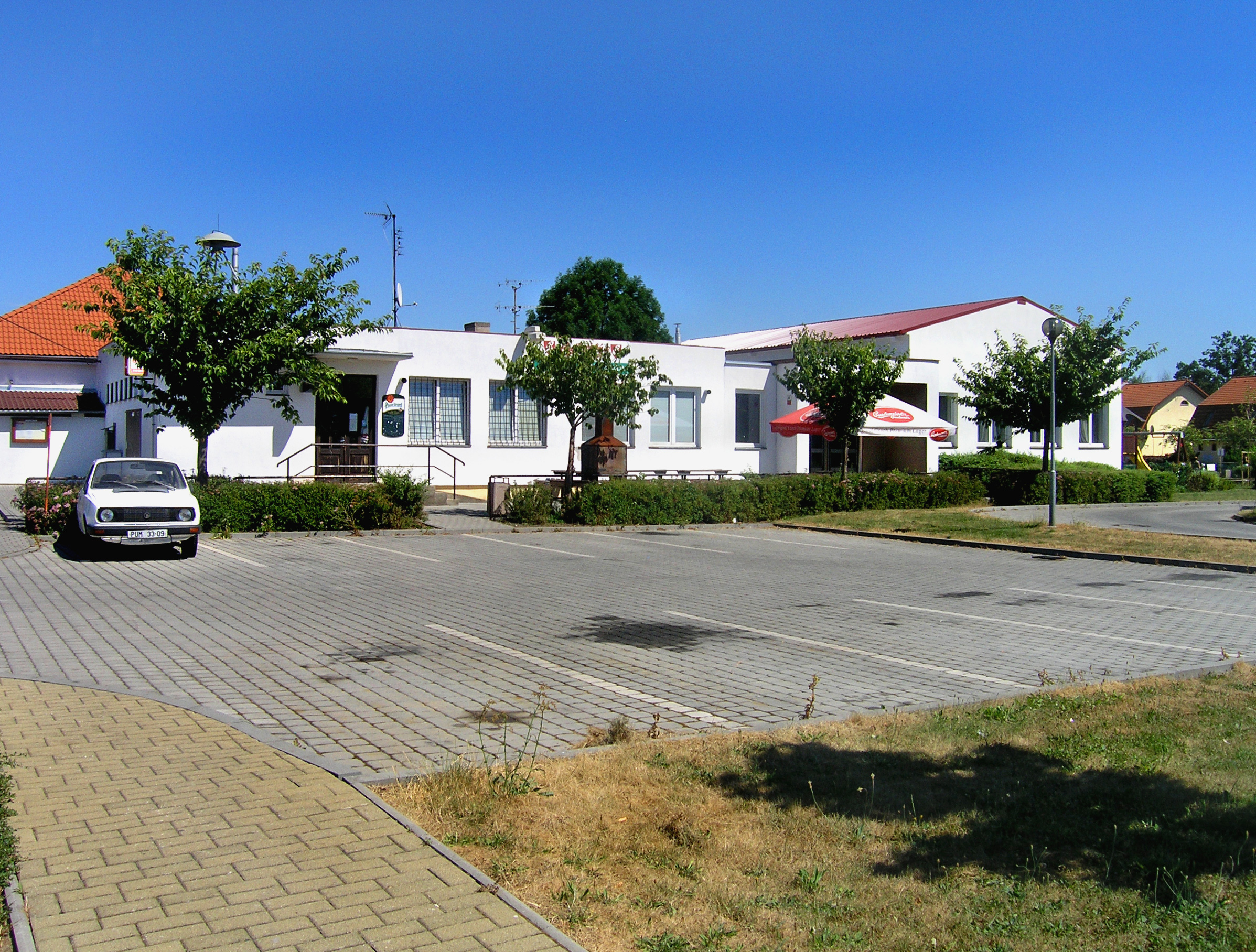
- A restaurant in Srnojedy

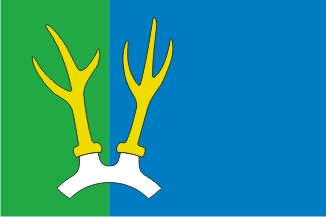
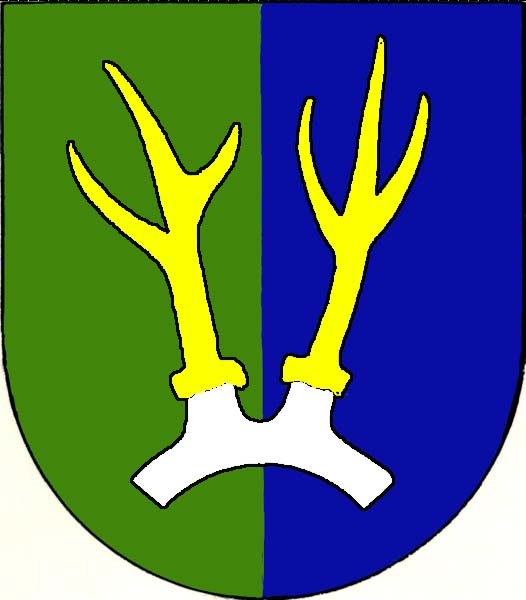
- Flag Coat of arms

- Location in the Czech Republic
- Coordinates: 50°2′21″N 15°42′10″E
- Country: Czech Republic
- Region: Pardubice
- District: Pardubice
- First mentioned: 1410

Area
  - Total: 2.48 km^{2} (0.96 sq mi)
- Elevation: 217 m (712 ft)

Population (2026-01-01)
  - Total: 783
  - Density: 316/km^{2} (818/sq mi)
- Time zone: UTC+1 (CET)
  - Summer (DST): UTC+2 (CEST)
- Postal code: 530 02
- Website: www.srnojedy.cz

Srnojedy is a municipality and village in Pardubice District in the Pardubice Region of the Czech Republic. It has about 800 inhabitants.

== Demographics ==
Historical population
Year	Pop.	±%
1869	120	—
1880	137	+14.2%
1890	154	+12.4%
1900	170	+10.4%
1910	176	+3.5%
1921	187	+6.2%
1930	226	+20.9%
1950	206	−8.8%
1961	271	+31.6%
1970	260	−4.1%
1980	244	−6.2%
1991	229	−6.1%
2001	278	+21.4%
2011	646	+132.4%
2021	827	+28.0%
Source: Censuses

== Paleontology ==
In 1893, a few bone fragments of a Cretaceous reptile (presumably a small dinosaur of uncertain affinities) were found here. Antonín Frič named it Albisaurus scutifer in 1905.
