= Microdiplatys oculatus =

Scientific classification
- Domain: Eukaryota
- Kingdom: Animalia
- Phylum: Arthropoda
- Class: Insecta
- Order: Dermaptera
- Family: †Protodiplatyidae
- Genus: †Microdiplatys
- Species: †M. oculatus

Binomial name
- †Microdiplatys oculatus Vishnyakova, 1980

Extinct species of earwig

Microdiplatys oculatus is an extinct species of earwig in the family Protodiplatyidae. It is one of only two species in the genus Microdiplatys, the other being Microdiplatys campodeiformis.
