= Microdiplatys campodeiformis =

Scientific classification
- Domain: Eukaryota
- Kingdom: Animalia
- Phylum: Arthropoda
- Class: Insecta
- Order: Dermaptera
- Family: †Protodiplatyidae
- Genus: †Microdiplatys
- Species: †M. campodeiformis

Binomial name
- †Microdiplatys campodeiformis Vishnyakova, 1980

Extinct species of earwig

Microdiplatys campodeiformis is an extinct species of earwig in the family Protodiplatyidae. It is one of only two species in the genus Microdiplatys, the other being Microdiplatys oculatus.
