= Holubice (Prague-West District) =

- Municipality
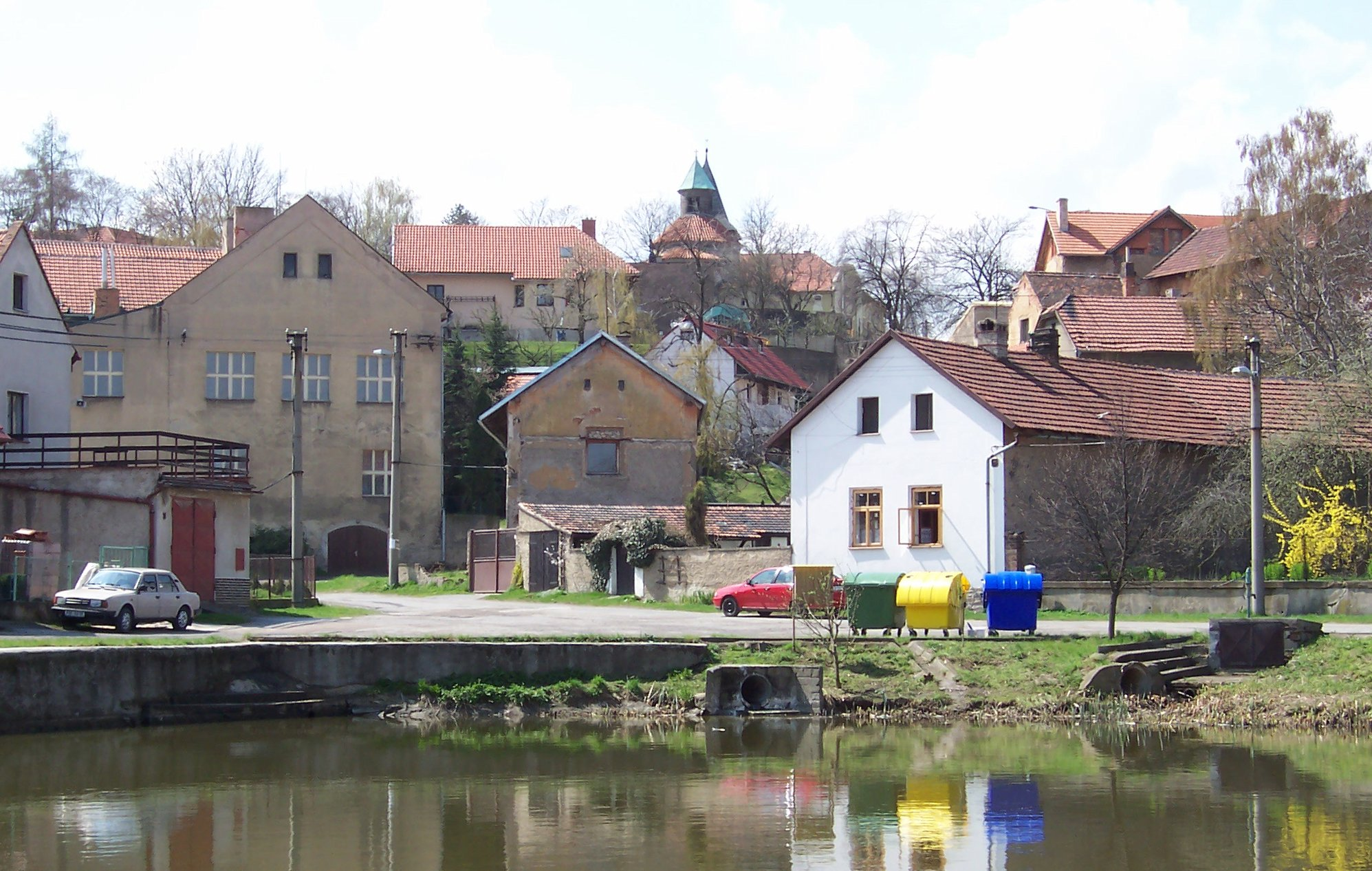
- View from the pond towards the church

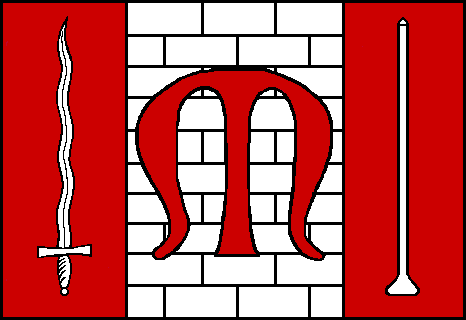
- Flag Coat of arms

- Location in the Czech Republic
- Coordinates: 50°12′11″N 14°17′35″E
- Country: Czech Republic
- Region: Central Bohemian
- District: Prague-West
- First mentioned: 1204

Area
  - Total: 7.96 km^{2} (3.07 sq mi)
- Elevation: 187 m (614 ft)

Population (2026-01-01)
  - Total: 2,200
  - Density: 280/km^{2} (720/sq mi)
- Time zone: UTC+1 (CET)
  - Summer (DST): UTC+2 (CEST)
- Postal code: 252 65
- Website: www.holubicekozinec.cz

Holubice is a municipality and village in Prague-West District in the Central Bohemian Region of the Czech Republic. It has about 2,200 inhabitants.

== Administrative division ==
Holubice consists of two municipal parts (in brackets population according to the 2021 census):

- Holubice (797)
- Kozinec (1,534)

== Etymology ==
The name is derived from the personal name Holub, meaning "the village of Holub's people".

== Geography ==
Holubice is located about 13 kilometres (8 mi) north of Prague. It lies in the Prague Plateau. The highest point is the hill Ers at 345 m (1,132 ft) above sea level.

== History ==
The first written mention of Holubice is in a donation deed of King Ottokar I from 1204. From 1547 to 1622, the village was owned by the Gryspek of Gryspach family. After their properties were confiscated by the royal chamber as a result of the Battle of the White Mountain, Polyxena of Lobkowicz acquired Holubice in 1623. Since then, it was property of the Lobkowicz family.

== Demographics ==
Historical population

Year	Pop.	±%
1869	830	—
1880	925	+11.4%
1890	914	−1.2%
1900	980	+7.2%
1910	957	−2.3%

Year	Pop.	±%
1921	980	+2.4%
1930	996	+1.6%
1950	751	−24.6%
1961	769	+2.4%
1970	735	−4.4%

Year	Pop.	±%
1980	646	−12.1%
1991	577	−10.7%
2001	609	+5.5%
2011	1,659	+172.4%
2021	2,331	+40.5%

Source: Censuses

== Transport ==
There are no railways or major roads passing through the municipality.

== Sights ==
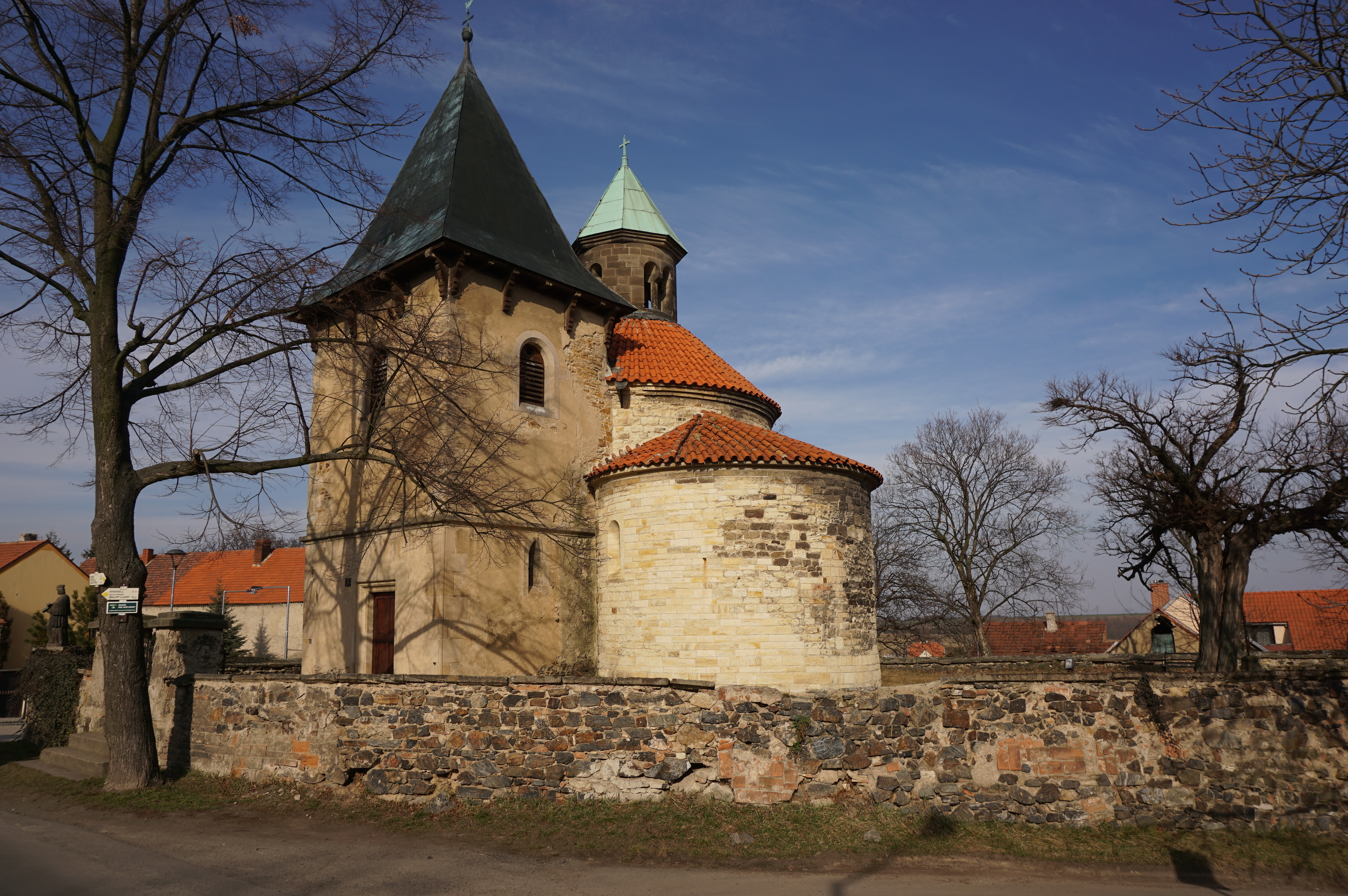
Church of the Nativity of the Virgin Mary

The most important monument is the Church of the Nativity of the Virgin Mary. It is a Romanesque-Gothic building with the core from the first half of the 13th century. It was rebuilt several times, but retains its medieval character.

== Paleontology ==
In 1878 a few fossil fragments of some small Cretaceous reptile (presumably a small dinosaur of uncertain affinities) were found here. Czech naturalist Antonín Frič named it Procerosaurus exogyrarum, now it is known as Ponerosteus exogyrarum.
