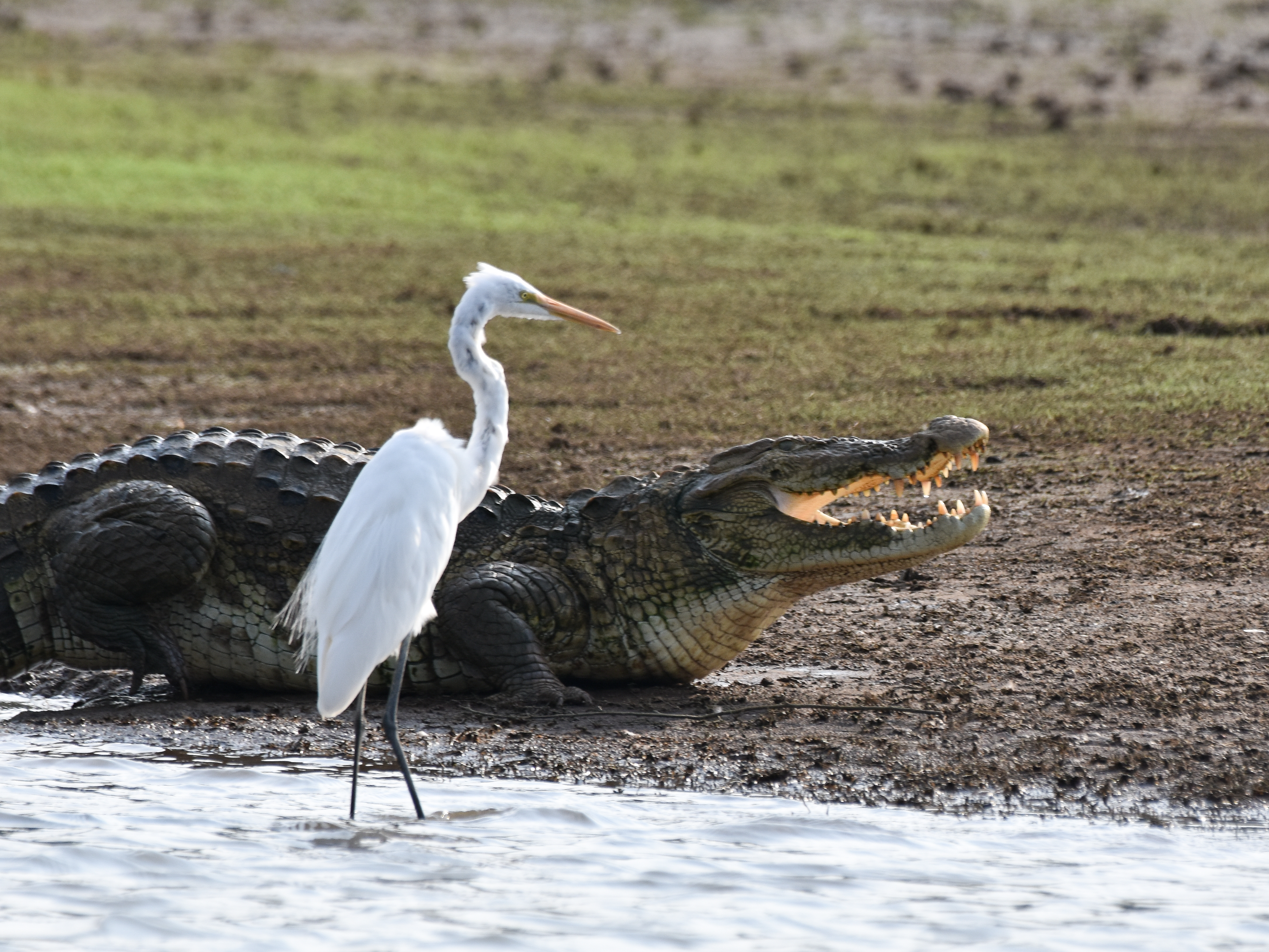
- Birds and crocodilians (in this case, a great egret and a mugger crocodile) are the only known living archosaur groups.

Scientific classification
- Kingdom: Animalia
- Phylum: Chordata
- Clade: Eucrocopoda
- Clade: Archosauria; Cope, 1869

Subgroups
- Avemetatarsalia
  (birds and their extinct relatives)
- Pseudosuchia
  (crocodilians and their extinct relatives)
Archosaurs of
uncertain affinity
- †Albisaurus
- †Avalonianus
- †Avipes
- †Incertovenator?
- †Jushatyria
- †Palaeosaurus
- †Picrodon
- †Protecovasaurus?
- †Sikannisuchus
- †Smok
- †Yaverlandia
- †Zanclodon
- †Phytosauria?(paraphyletic?)

Synonyms
- Avesuchia Benton, 1999

= Archosaur =

Archosaurs Temporal range: Early Triassic–Present, 248–0 Ma

Group of diapsids broadly classified as reptiles

Archosauria or archosaurs (/ˈɑːrkəˌsɔːr/) (Note: from Ancient Greek: αρχι-, romanized: archi- and sauros, meaning 'ruling lizard') is a clade of diapsid sauropsid tetrapods, with birds and crocodilians being the only known extant representatives. Although broadly classified as reptiles, which traditionally exclude birds, the cladistic sense of the term includes all living and extinct relatives of birds and crocodilians such as non-avian dinosaurs, pterosaurs, phytosaurs, aetosaurs and rauisuchians as well as many Mesozoic marine reptiles. Modern paleontologists define Archosauria as a crown group that includes the most recent common ancestor of living birds and crocodilians, and all of its descendants.

The base of Archosauria splits into two clades: Pseudosuchia, which includes crocodilians and their extinct relatives; and Avemetatarsalia, which includes birds and their extinct relatives (such as non-avian dinosaurs and pterosaurs). Older definitions of the group Archosauria rely on shared morphological characteristics, such as an antorbital fenestra in the skull, serrated teeth, and an upright stance. Some extinct reptiles, such as proterosuchids and euparkeriids, also possessed these features yet originated prior to the split between the crocodilian and bird lineages. The older morphological definition of Archosauria nowadays roughly corresponds to Archosauriformes, a group named to encompass crown-group archosaurs and their close relatives.

The oldest true archosaur fossils are known from the Early Triassic period, though the first archosauriforms and archosauromorphs (reptilians closer to archosaurs than to lizards or other lepidosaurs) appeared in the Permian. Archosaurs quickly diversified in the aftermath of the Permian-Triassic mass extinction (~252 Ma), which wiped out most of the then-dominant therapsid competitors such as the gorgonopsians and anomodonts, and the subsequent arid Triassic climate allowed the more drought-resilient archosaurs (largely due to their uric acid-based urinary system) to eventually become the largest and most ecologically dominant terrestrial vertebrates from the Middle Triassic period up until the Cretaceous–Paleogene extinction event (~66 Ma). Birds and several crocodyliform lineages were the only archosaurs known to have survived the K-Pg extinction, rediversifying in the subsequent Cenozoic era. Birds in particular have become among the most species-rich groups of terrestrial vertebrates in the present day.

== Distinguishing characteristics ==
Archosaurs can traditionally be distinguished from other tetrapods on the basis of several synapomorphies, or shared characteristics, which were present in their last common ancestor. Many of these characteristics appeared prior to the origin of the clade Archosauria, as they were present in archosauriforms such as Proterosuchus and Euparkeria, which were outside the crown group.

General pattern of skull fenestration in archosaurs

The most obvious features include teeth set in deep sockets, antorbital and mandibular fenestrae (openings in front of the eyes and in the jaw, respectively), and a pronounced fourth trochanter (a prominent ridge on the femur). Being set in sockets, the teeth were less likely to be torn loose during feeding. This feature is responsible for the name "thecodont" (meaning "socket teeth"), which early paleontologists applied to many Triassic archosaurs. Additionally, non-muscular cheek and lip tissue appear in various forms throughout the clade, with all living archosaurs lacking non-muscular lips, unlike most non-avian saurischian dinosaurs. Some archosaurs, such as birds, are secondarily toothless. Antorbital fenestrae reduced the weight of the skull, which was relatively large in early archosaurs, rather like that of modern crocodilians. Mandibular fenestrae may also have reduced the weight of the jaw in some forms. The fourth trochanter provides a large site for the attachment of muscles on the femur. Stronger muscles allowed for erect gaits in early archosaurs, and may also be connected with the ability of the archosaurs or their immediate ancestors to survive the catastrophic Permian-Triassic extinction event.

Unlike their close living relatives, the lepidosaurs, archosaurs lost the vomeronasal organ.

== Origins ==
Archosaurs are a subgroup of archosauriforms, which themselves are a subgroup of archosauromorphs. Both the oldest archosauromorph (Protorosaurus speneri) and the oldest archosauriform (Archosaurus rossicus) lived in the late Permian. The oldest true archosaurs appeared during the Olenekian stage (247–251 Ma) of the Early Triassic. A few fragmentary fossils of large carnivorous crocodilian-line archosaurs (informally termed "rauisuchians") are known from this stage. These include Scythosuchus and Tsylmosuchus (both of which have been found in Russia), as well as the Xilousuchus, a ctenosauriscid from China. The oldest known fossils of bird-line archosaurs are from the Anisian stage (247–242 Ma) of Tanzania, and include Asilisaurus (an early silesaurid), Teleocrater (an aphanosaur), and Nyasasaurus (a possible early dinosaur).

== Archosaurian domination in the Triassic ==
Synapsids are a clade that includes mammals and their extinct ancestors. The latter group are often referred to as mammal-like reptiles, but should be termed protomammals, stem mammals, or basal synapsids, because they are not true reptiles by modern cladistic classification. They were the dominant land vertebrates throughout the Permian, but most perished in the Permian–Triassic extinction event. Very few large synapsids survived the event, but one form, Lystrosaurus (a herbivorous dicynodont), attained a widespread distribution soon after the extinction. Following this, archosaurs and other archosauriforms quickly became the dominant land vertebrates in the early Triassic. Fossils from before the mass extinction have only been found around the Equator, but after the event fossils can be found all over the world. Suggested explanations for this include:

- Archosaurs made more rapid progress towards erect limbs than synapsids, and this gave them greater stamina by avoiding Carrier's constraint. An objection to this explanation is that archosaurs became dominant while they still had sprawling or semi-erect limbs, similar to those of Lystrosaurus and other synapsids.
- Archosaurs have more efficient respiratory systems featuring unidirectional air flow, as opposed to the tidal respiration of synapsids. The ability to breathe more efficiently in hypoxic conditions may have been advantageous to early archosaurs during the suspected drop in oxygen levels at the end of the Permian.
- The Early Triassic was predominantly arid, because most of the Earth's land was concentrated in the supercontinent Pangaea. Archosaurs were probably better at conserving water than early synapsids because:
  - Modern diapsids (lizards, snakes, crocodilians, birds) excrete uric acid, which can be excreted as a paste, resulting in low water loss as opposed to a more dilute urine. It is reasonable to suppose that archosaurs (the ancestors of crocodilians, dinosaurs and pterosaurs) also excreted uric acid, and therefore were good at conserving water. The aglandular (glandless) skins of diapsids would also have helped to conserve water.
  - Modern mammals excrete urea, which requires a relatively high urinary rate to keep it from leaving the urine by diffusion in the kidney tubules. Their skins also contain many glands, which also lose water. Assuming that early synapsids had similar features, e.g., as argued by the authors of Palaeos, they were at a disadvantage in a mainly arid world. The same well-respected site points out that "for much of Australia's Plio-Pleistocene history, where conditions were probably similar, the largest terrestrial predators were not mammals but gigantic varanid lizards (Megalania) and land crocs."

However, this theory has been questioned, since it implies synapsids were necessarily less advantaged in water retention, that synapsid decline coincides with climate changes or archosaur diversity (neither of which tested) and the fact that desert dwelling mammals are as well adapted in this department as archosaurs, and some cynodonts like Trucidocynodon were large sized predators. A study favors competition amidst mammaliaforms as the main explanation for Mesozoic mammals being small.

== Main forms ==
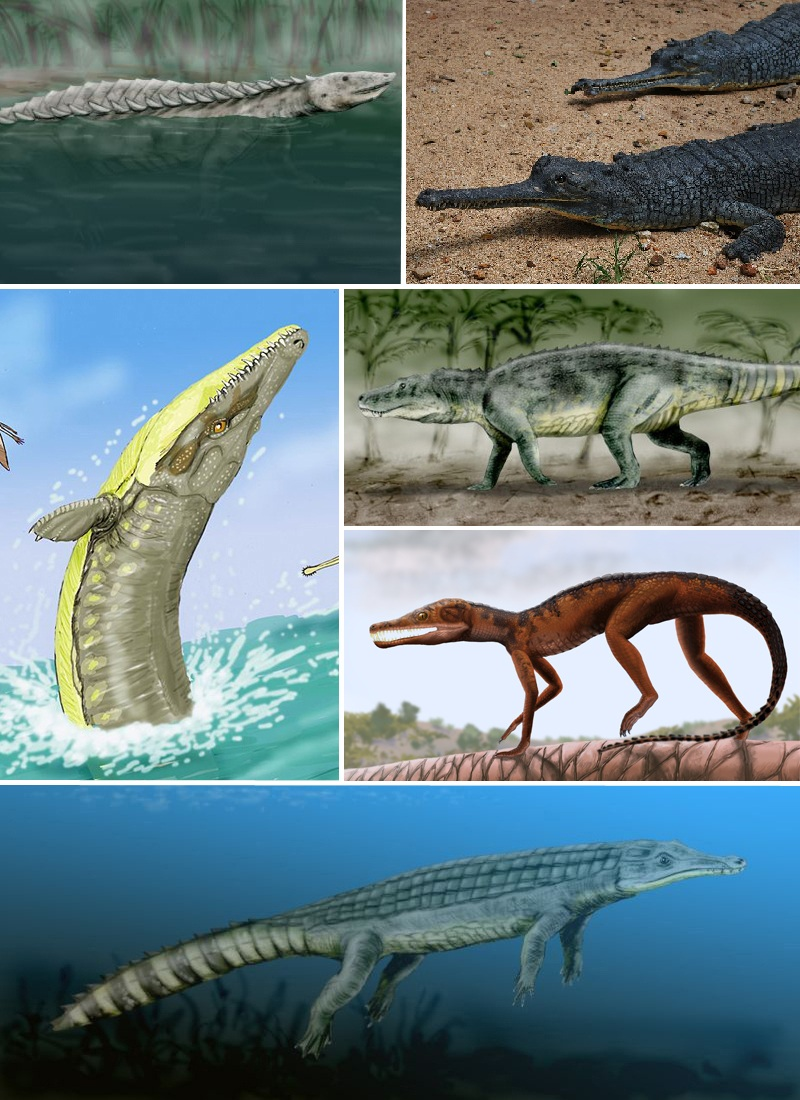
Examples of pseudosuchians. Clockwise from top-left: Longosuchus meadei (an aetosaur), Gavialis gangeticus (a crocodilian), Saurosuchus galilei (a loricatan), Pedeticosaurus leviseuri (a sphenosuchian), Chenanisuchus lateroculi (a dyrosaurid), and Dakosaurus maximus (a thalattosuchian).

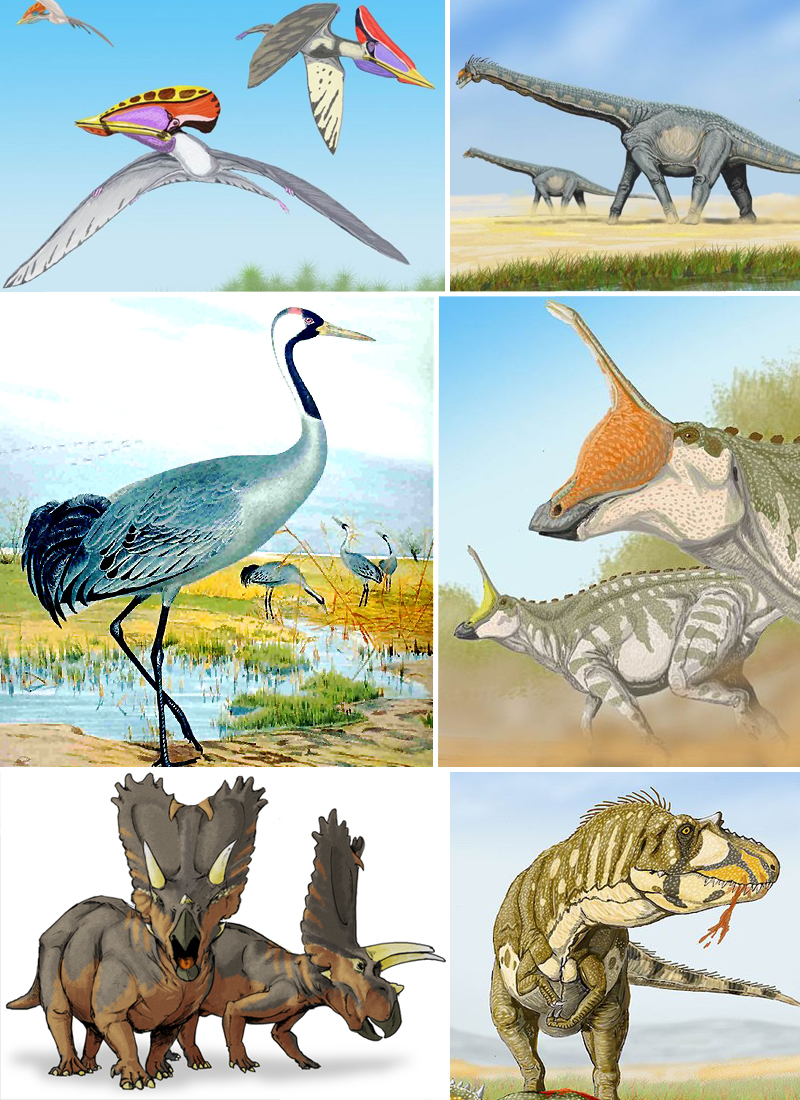
Examples of avemetatarsalians. Clockwise from top-left: Tupuxuara leonardi (a pterosaur), Alamosaurus sanjuanensis, (a sauropod), Tsintaosaurus spinorhinus (an ornithopod), Daspletosaurus torosus (a tyrannosaurid), Pentaceratops sternbergii (a ceratopsian), and Grus grus (a neornithian).

Since the 1970s, scientists have classified archosaurs mainly on the basis of their ankles. The earliest archosaurs had "primitive mesotarsal" ankles: the astragalus and calcaneum were fixed to the tibia and fibula by sutures and the joint bent about the contact between these bones and the foot.

The Pseudosuchia appeared early in the Triassic. In their ankles, the astragalus was joined to the tibia by a suture and the joint rotated round a peg on the astragalus which fitted into a socket in the calcaneum. Early "crurotarsans" still walked with sprawling limbs, but some later crurotarsans developed fully erect limbs. Modern crocodilians are crurotarsans that can employ a diverse range of gaits depending on speed.

Euparkeria and the Ornithosuchidae had "reversed crurotarsal" ankles, with a peg on the calcaneum and socket on the astragalus.

The earliest fossils of Avemetatarsalia ("bird ankles") appear in the Anisian age of the Middle Triassic. Most Ornithodirans had "advanced mesotarsal" ankles. This form of ankle incorporated a very large astragalus and very small calcaneum, and could only move in one plane, like a simple hinge. This arrangement, which was only suitable for animals with erect limbs, provided more stability when the animals were running. The earliest avemetatarsalians, such as Teleocrater and Asilisaurus, retained "primitive mesotarsal" ankles. The ornithodirans differed from other archosaurs in other ways: they were lightly built and usually small, their necks were long and had an S-shaped curve, their skulls were much more lightly built, and many ornithodirans were completely bipedal. The archosaurian fourth trochanter on the femur may have made it easier for ornithodirans to become bipeds, because it provided more leverage for the thigh muscles. In the late Triassic, the ornithodirans diversified to produce dinosaurs and pterosaurs.

== Classification ==
=== Modern classification ===
Archosauria is normally defined as a crown group, which means that it only includes descendants of the last common ancestors of its living representatives. In the case of archosaurs, these are birds and crocodilians. Archosauria is within the larger clade Archosauriformes, which includes some close relatives of archosaurs, such as proterochampsids and euparkeriids. These relatives are often referred to as archosaurs despite being placed outside of the crown group Archosauria in a more basal position within Archosauriformes. Historically, many archosauriforms were described as archosaurs, including proterosuchids and erythrosuchids, based on the presence of an antorbital fenestra. While many researchers prefer to treat Archosauria as an unranked clade, some continue to assign it a traditional biological rank. Traditionally, Archosauria has been treated as a Superorder, though a few 21st century researchers have assigned it to different ranks including Division and Class.

=== History of classification ===
Archosauria as a term was coined by American paleontologist Edward Drinker Cope in 1869, and included a wide range of taxa including dinosaurs, crocodilians, thecodonts, sauropterygians (which may be related to turtles), rhynchocephalians (a group that according to Cope included rhynchosaurs, which nowadays are considered to be more basal archosauromorphs, and tuataras, which are lepidosaurs), and anomodonts, which are now considered synapsids. It was not until 1986 that Archosauria was defined as a crown-clade, restricting its use to more derived taxa.

Archosaur ankle types: Adapted with permission from Palaeos
Tibia Fibula Astragalus Calcaneum

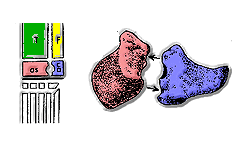
Primitive mesotarsal ankle

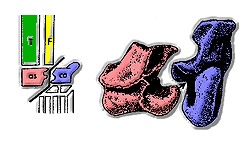
Crocodilian form of crurotarsal ankle

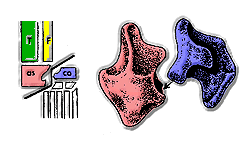
Reversed crurotarsal ankle

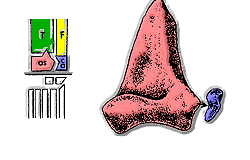
"Advanced" mesotarsal ankle

Cope's term was a Greek-Latin hybrid intended to refer to the cranial arches, but has later also been understood as "leading reptiles" or "ruling reptiles" by association with Greek ἀρχός "leader, ruler".

The term "thecodont", now considered an obsolete term, was first used by the English paleontologist Richard Owen in 1859 to describe Triassic archosaurs, and it became widely used in the 20th century. Thecodonts were considered the "basal stock" from which the more advanced archosaurs descended. They did not possess features seen in later avian and crocodilian lines, and therefore were considered more primitive and ancestral to the two groups. With the cladistic revolution of the 1980s and 90s, in which cladistics became the most widely used method of classifying organisms, thecodonts were no longer considered a valid grouping. Because they are considered a "basal stock", thecodonts are paraphyletic, meaning that they form a group that does not include all descendants of its last common ancestor: in this case, the more derived crocodilians and birds are excluded from "Thecodontia" as it was formerly understood. The description of the basal ornithodires Lagerpeton and Lagosuchus in the 1970s provided evidence that linked thecodonts with dinosaurs, and contributed to the disuse of the term "Thecodontia", which many cladists consider an artificial grouping.

With the identification of "crocodilian normal" and "crocodilian reversed" ankles by Sankar Chatterjee in 1978, a basal split in Archosauria was identified. Chatterjee considered these two groups to be Pseudosuchia with the "normal" ankle and Ornithosuchidae with the "reversed" ankle. Ornithosuchids were thought to be ancestral to dinosaurs at this time. In 1979, A.R.I. Cruickshank identified the basal split and thought that the crurotarsan ankle developed independently in these two groups, but in opposite ways. Cruickshank also thought that the development of these ankle types progressed in each group to allow advanced members to have semi-erect (in the case of crocodilians) or erect (in the case of dinosaurs) gaits.

=== Phylogeny ===
In many phylogenetic analyses, archosaurs have been shown to be a monophyletic grouping, thus forming a true clade. One of the first studies of archosaur phylogeny was authored by French paleontologist Jacques Gauthier in 1986. Gauthier split Archosauria into Pseudosuchia, the crocodilian line, and Ornithosuchia, the dinosaur and pterosaur line. Pseudosuchia was defined as all archosaurs more closely related to crocodiles, while Ornithosuchia was defined as all archosaurs more closely related to birds. Proterochampsids, erythrosuchids, and proterosuchids fell successively outside Archosauria in the resulting tree. Below is the cladogram from Gauthier (1986):

- Sauropsida
  - †Proterosuchidae
  - - †Erythrosuchidae
    - - †Proterochampsidae
      - Archosauria
        - Pseudosuchia
          - †Parasuchia
          - - †Aetosauria
            - - †Rauisuchia
              - Crocodylomorpha
        - Ornithosuchia
          - †Euparkeria
          - - †Ornithosuchidae
            - Ornithodira

In 1988, paleontologists Michael Benton and J. M. Clark produced a new tree in a phylogenetic study of basal archosaurs. As in Gauthier's tree, Benton and Clark's revealed a basal split within Archosauria. They referred to the two groups as Crocodylotarsi and Ornithosuchia. Crocodylotarsi was defined as an apomorphy-based taxon based on the presence of a "crocodile-normal" ankle joint (considered to be the defining apomorphy of the clade). Gauthier's Pseudosuchia, by contrast, was a stem-based taxon. Unlike Gauthier's tree, Benton and Clark's places Euparkeria outside Ornithosuchia and outside the crown group Archosauria altogether.

The clades Crurotarsi and Ornithodira were first used together in 1990 by paleontologist Paul Sereno and A. B. Arcucci in their phylogenetic study of archosaurs. They were the first to erect the clade Crurotarsi, while Ornithodira was named by Gauthier in 1986. Crurotarsi and Ornithodira replaced Pseudosuchia and Ornithosuchia, respectively, as the monophyly of both of these clades were questioned. Sereno and Arcucci incorporated archosaur features other than ankle types in their analyses, which resulted in a different tree than previous analyses. Below is a cladogram based on Sereno (1991), which is similar to the one produced by Sereno and Arcucci:

- Archosauriformes
  - †Proterosuchidae
  - - †Erythrosuchidae
    - - †Euparkeria
      - - †Proterochampsidae
        - Archosauria
          - Crurotarsi
            - †Parasuchia
            - - †Ornithosuchidae
              - Suchia
          - Ornithodira
            - - †?Scleromochlus
              - †Pterosauria
            - Dinosauromorpha

Ornithodira and Crurotarsi are both node-based clades, meaning that they are defined to include the last common ancestor of two or more taxa and all of its descendants. Ornithodira includes the last common ancestor of pterosaurs and dinosaurs (which include birds), while Crurotarsi includes the last common ancestor of living crocodilians and three groups of Triassic archosaurs: ornithosuchids, aetosaurs, and phytosaurs. These clades are not equivalent to "bird-line" and "crocodile-line" archosaurs, which would be branch-based clades defined as all taxa more closely related to one living group (either birds or crocodiles) than the other.

Benton proposed the name Avemetatarsalia in 1999 to include all bird-line archosaurs (under his definition, all archosaurs more closely related to dinosaurs than to crocodilians). His analysis of the small Triassic archosaur Scleromochlus placed it within bird-line archosaurs but outside Ornithodira, meaning that Ornithodira was no longer equivalent to bird-line archosaurs. Below is a cladogram modified from Benton (2004) showing this phylogeny:

- Archosauria
  - †Hyperodapedon (Rhynchosauria)
  - - †Prolacerta (Prolacertiformes)
    - - †Proterosuchus (Proterosuchidae)
      - - †Euparkeria (Euparkeriidae)
        - - †Proterochampsidae
          - Avesuchia (Crown group Archosauria)
            - Crurotarsi
              - - †Phytosauridae
                - †Gracilisuchus
              - †Ornithosuchidae
              - Suchia
                - †Stagonolepididae
                - - †Postosuchus
                  - Crocodylomorpha
                - - †Fasolasuchus
                  - Prestosuchidae
                    - †Ticinosuchus
                    - †Prestosuchus
                    - †Saurosuchus
            - Avemetatarsalia
              - †Scleromochlus
              - Ornithodira
                - †Pterosauria
                - Dinosauromorpha
                  - †Lagerpeton
                  - Dinosauriformes
                    - †Marasuchus
                    - Dinosauria
                      - †Ornithischia
                      - Saurischia
                        - †Sauropodomorpha
                        - Theropoda
                          - †Herrerasaurus
                          - Neotheropoda

In Sterling Nesbitt's 2011 monograph on early archosaurs, a phylogenetic analysis found strong support for phytosaurs falling outside Archosauria. Many subsequent studies supported this phylogeny. Because Crurotarsi is defined by the inclusion of phytosaurs, the placement of phytosaurs outside Archosauria means that Crurotarsi must include all of Archosauria. Nesbitt reinstated Pseudosuchia as a clade name for crocodile-line archosaurs, using it as a stem-based taxon. Below is a cladogram modified from Nesbitt (2011):

- Sauropsida
  - †Phytosauria
  - Archosauria
    - Pseudosuchia
      - †Ornithosuchidae
      - Suchia
        - †Gracilisuchus
        - †Turfanosuchus
        - - †Revueltosaurus
          - †Aetosauria
        - - †Ticinosuchus
          - Paracrocodylomorpha
            - †Poposauroidea
            - Loricata
              - †Prestosuchus
              - - †Saurosuchus
                - - †Batrachotomus
                  - - †Fasolasuchus
                    - - †Rauisuchidae
                      - Crocodylomorpha
    - Avemetatarsalia / Ornithodira*
      - †Pterosauromorpha
      - Dinosauromorpha
        - †Lagerpetidae
        - Dinosauriformes
          - †Marasuchus
          - - †Silesauridae
            - Dinosauria
              - †Ornithischia
              - Saurischia
                - †Sauropodomorpha
                - Neotheropoda
  * Nesbitt did not include Scleromochlus in the analysis, meaning that Avemetatarsalia and Ornithodira occupy the same place in this cladogram

== Extinction and survival ==
Crocodylomorphs, pterosaurs and dinosaurs survived the Triassic–Jurassic extinction event about 200 million years ago, but other archosaurs had become extinct at or prior to the Triassic-Jurassic boundary.

Non-avian dinosaurs and pterosaurs perished in the Cretaceous–Paleogene extinction event, which occurred approximately 66 million years ago, but crown-group birds (the only remaining dinosaur group) and many crocodyliforms survived. Both are descendants of archosaurs, and are therefore archosaurs themselves under phylogenetic taxonomy.

Crocodilians (which include all modern crocodiles, alligators, and gharials) and birds flourish today in the Holocene. It is generally agreed that birds have the most species of all terrestrial vertebrates.

== Archosaur lifestyle ==
=== Hip joints and locomotion ===
Hip joints and hindlimb postures

Like the early tetrapods, early archosaurs had a sprawling gait because their hip sockets faced sideways, and the knobs at the tops of their femurs were in line with the femur. In the early to middle Triassic, some archosaur groups developed hip joints that allowed (or required) a more erect gait. This gave them greater stamina, because it avoided Carrier's constraint, i.e. they could run and breathe easily at the same time. There were two main types of joint which allowed erect legs:

- The hip sockets faced sideways, but the knobs on the femurs were at right angles to the rest of the femur, which therefore pointed downwards. Dinosaurs evolved from archosaurs with this hip arrangement.
- The hip sockets faced downwards and the knobs on the femurs were in line with the femur. This "pillar-erect" arrangement appears to have evolved independently in various archosaur lineages, for example it was common in "Rauisuchia" (non-crocodylomorph paracrocodylomorphs) and also appeared in some aetosaurs.

It has been pointed out that an upright stance requires more energy, so it may indicate a higher metabolism and a higher body temperature.

=== Diet ===
Most were large predators, but members of various lines diversified into other niches. Aetosaurs were herbivores and some developed extensive armor. A few crocodyliforms were herbivores, e.g., Simosuchus, Phyllodontosuchus. The large crocodyliform Stomatosuchus may have been a filter feeder. Sauropodomorphs and ornithischian dinosaurs were herbivores with diverse adaptations for feeding biomechanics.

=== Land, water and air ===
Archosaurs are mainly portrayed as land animals, but:

- Many phytosaurs and crocodyliforms dominated the rivers and swamps and even invaded the seas (e.g., the teleosaurs, Metriorhynchidae and Dyrosauridae). The Metriorhynchidae were rather dolphin-like, with paddle-like forelimbs, a tail fluke and smooth, unarmoured skins.
- Two clades of ornithodirans, the pterosaurs and the birds, dominated the air after becoming adapted to a volant lifestyle.
- Some dinosaurs like Spinosaurus have been argued to have had a semiaquatic lifestyle. Hesperornithes and penguins also adapted to this lifestyle.

=== Metabolism ===
The metabolism of archosaurs is still a controversial topic. They certainly evolved from cold-blooded ancestors, and the surviving non-dinosaurian archosaurs, crocodilians, are cold-blooded. But crocodilians have some features which are normally associated with a warm-blooded metabolism because they improve the animal's oxygen supply:

- 4-chambered hearts. Both birds and mammals have 4-chambered hearts, which completely separate the flows of oxygenated and de-oxygenated blood. Non-crocodilian reptiles have 3-chambered hearts, which are less efficient because they let the two flows mix and thus send some de-oxygenated blood out to the body instead of to the lungs. Modern crocodilians' hearts are 4-chambered, but are smaller relative to body size and run at lower pressure than those of modern birds and mammals. They also have a pulmonary bypass, which makes them functionally 3-chambered when under water, conserving oxygen.
- a secondary palate, which allows the animal to eat and breathe at the same time.
- a hepatic piston mechanism for pumping the lungs. This is different from the lung-pumping mechanisms of mammals and birds, but similar to what some researchers claim to have found in some dinosaurs.

Historically there has been uncertainty as to why natural selection favored the development of these features, which are very important for active warm-blooded creatures, but of little apparent use to cold-blooded aquatic ambush predators that spend the vast majority of their time floating in water or lying on river banks.

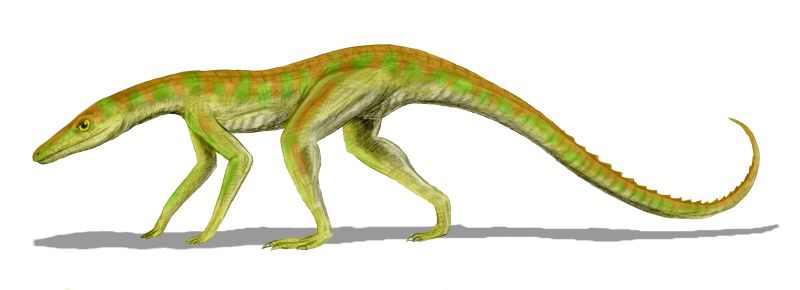
Terrestrisuchus

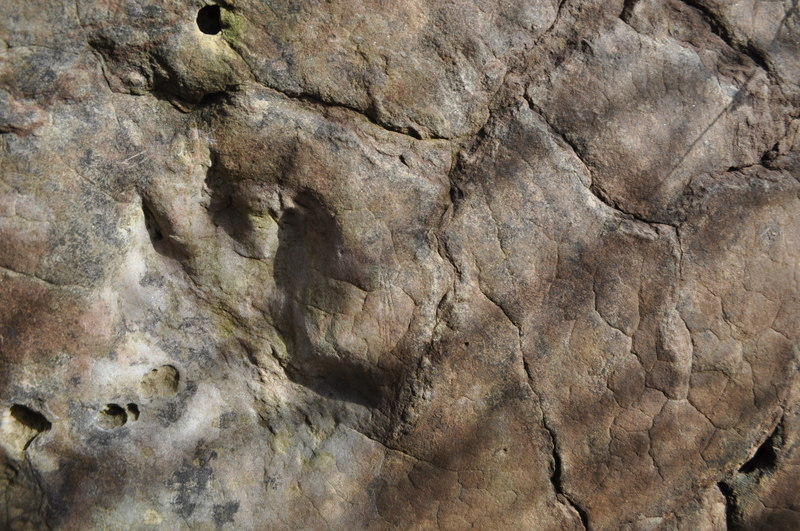
Chirotherium footprint in Triassic sediments

Paleontological evidence shows that the ancestors of living crocodilians were active and endothermic (warm-blooded). Some experts believe that their archosaur ancestors were warm-blooded as well. This is likely because feather-like filaments evolved to cover the whole body and were capable of providing thermal insulation. Physiological, anatomical, and developmental features of the crocodilian heart support the paleontological evidence and show that the lineage reverted to ectothermy when it invaded the aquatic, ambush predator niche. Crocodilian embryos develop fully 4-chambered hearts at an early stage. Modifications to the growing heart form a pulmonary bypass shunt that includes the left aortic arch, which originates from the right ventricle, the foramen of Panizza between the left and right aortic arches, and the cog-tooth valve at the base of the pulmonary artery. The shunt is used during diving to make the heart function as 3-chambered heart, providing the crocodilian with the neurally controlled shunting used by ectotherms. The researchers concluded that the ancestors of living crocodilians had fully 4-chambered hearts, and were therefore warm-blooded, before they reverted to a cold-blooded or ectothermic metabolism. The authors also provide other evidence for endothermy in stem archosaurs. It is reasonable to suggest that later crocodilians developed the pulmonary bypass shunt as they became cold-blooded, aquatic, and less active.

If the crocodilian ancestors and other Triassic archosaurs were warm-blooded, this would help to resolve some evolutionary puzzles:

- The earliest crocodylomorphs, e.g., Terrestrisuchus, were slim, leggy terrestrial predators whose build suggests a fairly active lifestyle, which requires a fairly fast metabolism. And some other crurotarsan archosaurs appear to have had erect limbs, while those of rauisuchians are very poorly adapted for any other posture. Erect limbs are advantageous for active animals because they avoid Carrier's constraint, but disadvantageous for more sluggish animals because they increase the energy costs of standing up and lying down.
- If early archosaurs were completely cold-blooded and (as seems most likely) dinosaurs were at least fairly warm-blooded, dinosaurs would have had to evolve warm-blooded metabolisms in less than half the time it took for synapsids to do the same.

=== Respiratory system ===
A 2010 study of the lungs of Alligator mississippiensis (the American alligator) has shown that the airflow through them is unidirectional, moving in the same direction during inhalation and exhalation. This is also seen in birds and many non-avian dinosaurs, which have air sacs to further aid in respiration. Both birds and alligators achieve unidirectional air flow through the presence of parabronchi, which are responsible for gas exchange. The study has found that in alligators, air enters through the second bronchial branch, moves through the parabronchi, and exits through the first bronchial branch. Unidirectional airflow in both birds and alligators suggests that this type of respiration was present at the base of Archosauria and retained by both dinosaurs and non-dinosaurian archosaurs, such as aetosaurs, "rauisuchians" (non-crocodylomorph paracrocodylomorphs), crocodylomorphs, and pterosaurs. The use of unidirectional airflow in the lungs of archosaurs may have given the group an advantage over synapsids, which had lungs where air moved tidally in and out through a network of bronchi that terminated in alveoli, which were cul-de-sacs. The better efficiency in gas transfer seen in archosaur lungs may have been advantageous during the times of low atmospheric oxygen which are thought to have existed during the Mesozoic.

== Reproduction ==
Most (if not all) archosaurs are oviparous. Birds and crocodilians lay hard-shelled eggs, as did extinct dinosaurs, and crocodylomorphs. Hard-shelled eggs are present in both dinosaurs and crocodilians, which has been used as an explanation for the absence of viviparity or ovoviviparity in archosaurs. However, both pterosaurs and baurusuchids have soft-shelled eggs, implying that hard shells are not a plesiomorphic condition. The pelvic anatomy of Cricosaurus and other metriorhynchids and fossilized embryos belonging to the non-archosaur archosauromorph Dinocephalosaurus, together suggest that the lack of viviparity among archosaurs may be a consequence of lineage-specific restrictions.

Archosaurs are ancestrally superprecocial as evidenced in various dinosaurs, pterosaurs, and crocodylomorphs. However, parental care did evolve independently multiple times in crocodilians, dinosaurs, and aetosaurs. In most such species the animals bury their eggs and rely on temperature-dependent sex determination. The notable exception are Neornithes which incubate their eggs and rely on genetic sex determination – a trait that might have given them a survival advantage over other dinosaurs.

== See also ==
- 2022 in archosaur paleontology

== Sources ==
- Benton, M. J. (2004). Vertebrate Paleontology (3rd ed.). Blackwell Science.
- Carroll, R. L. (1988). Vertebrate Paleontology and Evolution'. New York: W. H. Freeman. ISBN 978-0-7167-1822-2.
