= Albisaurus =

Albisaurus Temporal range: Late Cretaceous, 90–84 Ma

Scientific classification
- Domain: Eukaryota
- Kingdom: Animalia
- Phylum: Chordata
- Class: Reptilia
- Clade: Archosauromorpha
- Clade: Archosauriformes
- Clade: Archosauria
- Genus: †Albisaurus; Fritsch, 1905
- Species: †A. albinus

Binomial name
- †Albisaurus albinus (Fritsch, 1893)

Synonyms
- Iguanodon albinus Fritsch, 1892; Albisaurus scutifer Fritsch, 1905

Extinct genus of reptiles

Albisaurus (meaning "Albis [River] lizard") was once thought to be a genus of dinosaur, but is now thought to be a non-dinosaurian archosaur. It was first described by Antonin Fritsch (also spelt Frič), a Czech palaeontologist, in 1893, but the remains are sparse. The validity of the species cannot be proven based on the fossil remains, and it is usually marked as a nomen dubium. It lived during the Turonian-Santonian stages of the Cretaceous period (about 90–84 million years ago).

The generic name Albisaurus is derived from the Latin albus (albi-); after the River Albis, as it was known in Roman times, now the Bílé Labe (or "White Elbe"), a part of the Elbe River system, which flows through the eastern Czech Republic, near a site where the type fossils were found (Srnojedy by Pardubice); plus the Greek sauros meaning "lizard". Fritsch originally published the name as Iguanodon albinus in 1893. After re-evaluating the fossils, however, he decided they were distinct from Iguanodon. In 1905, he published a new name for this material, calling it Albisaurus scutifer. However, I. albinus has priority and is therefore the correct name for the material as it was based on the same type specimen as A. scutifer.

The type species is Albisaurus albinus. The specific name albinus is derived from the Latin albus (alb-), "white, bright", and the Latin suffix -inus; "belonging to", alluding to the modern-day Bile Labe of the western Czech Republic, known during the rule of the Roman Empire for the purity and clarity of the water.
