= Avalonianus =

Avalonianus Temporal range: Late Triassic, Rhaetian

Scientific classification
- Kingdom: Animalia
- Phylum: Chordata
- Class: Reptilia
- Clade: Archosauria
- Genus: †Avalonianus; Kuhn, 1961
- Species: †A. sanfordi

Binomial name
- †Avalonianus sanfordi Seeley, 1898

Synonyms
- Avalonia Seeley, 1898 (preoccupied); Picrodon? Seeley, 1898

Extinct genus of reptiles

Avalonianus is a highly dubious and possibly invalid genus of archosaur from the Late Triassic Westbury Formation of England. It was first described in 1898 by Harry Seeley with the name Avalonia, but that name was preoccupied (Walcott, 1889), so Oskar Kuhn renamed it in 1961, albeit with no epithet (although Seeley added the epithet sanfordi in 1898). It was thought to be a prosauropod, but later analysis revealed it was actually a chimera, with the original teeth coming from a non-dinosaurian ornithosuchian (or possibly an early theropod), and later-referred post-cranial prosauropod remains (which were renamed Camelotia). The only sufficient remains attributable to Avalonianus are several now lost fossil teeth from the chimera that were referred to Archosauria.
