= Picrodon =

Picrodon Temporal range: Late Triassic, Rhaetian

Scientific classification
- Kingdom: Animalia
- Phylum: Chordata
- Class: Reptilia
- Clade: Archosauria
- Genus: †Picrodon; Seeley, 1898
- Species: †P. herveyi

Binomial name
- †Picrodon herveyi Seeley, 1898

Possible dinosaur genus

Picrodon is the name given to a genus of archosaur, possibly a sauropodomorph dinosaur, from the Rhaetian of England which was possibly synonymous with the dubious archosaur Avalonianus. The type, and only species, P. herveyi, was named in 1898.

== Discovery and naming ==
In 1894, W. A. Sanford described the fossil remains of what he considered to be two large reptiles discovered in the parish of Wedmore, Somerset (Westbury Formation) by Rev. Sydenham H. A. Hervey and Sanford himself. Harry Govier Seeley described the fossils and named two genera: Avalonia (preoccupied; now Avalonianus) and Picrodon; both are based solely on teeth.

Only a single tooth, holotype BMNH R2875, belonging to P. herveyi is known, making the remains insufficient to make judgments on its diet or its classification; although it is agreed that Picrodon was an archosaur to some degree.

== Classification ==
Sanford (1894) classified Picrodon as a reptile, while Seeley (1898) classified Picrodon as a saurian. More modern research however almost certainly places Picrodon within Archosauria; Peter Malcolm Galton (1985) suggested that Picrodon may have been a basal sauropodomorph. Currently, its exact phylogenetic placement within Archosauria remains unknown.
