= Korycanar Formation =

Geologic formation in the Czech Republic

- Stratigraphic range: Late Cretaceous, Cenomanian
- Type: Geological formation

The Korycanar Formation is a Late Cretaceous geologic formation in the Czech Republic. Archosauromorph remains diagnostic to the genus level are among the fossils that have been recovered from the formation and also dinosaur remains are among the fossils that have been recovered from the formation, although none have yet been referred to a specific genus.

== Paleofauna ==
- Ponerosteus exogirarum - "Tibia"

== See also ==
- List of dinosaur-bearing rock formations
  - List of stratigraphic units with few dinosaur genera
