= Antonín Frič =

Czech paleontologist, biologist and geologist

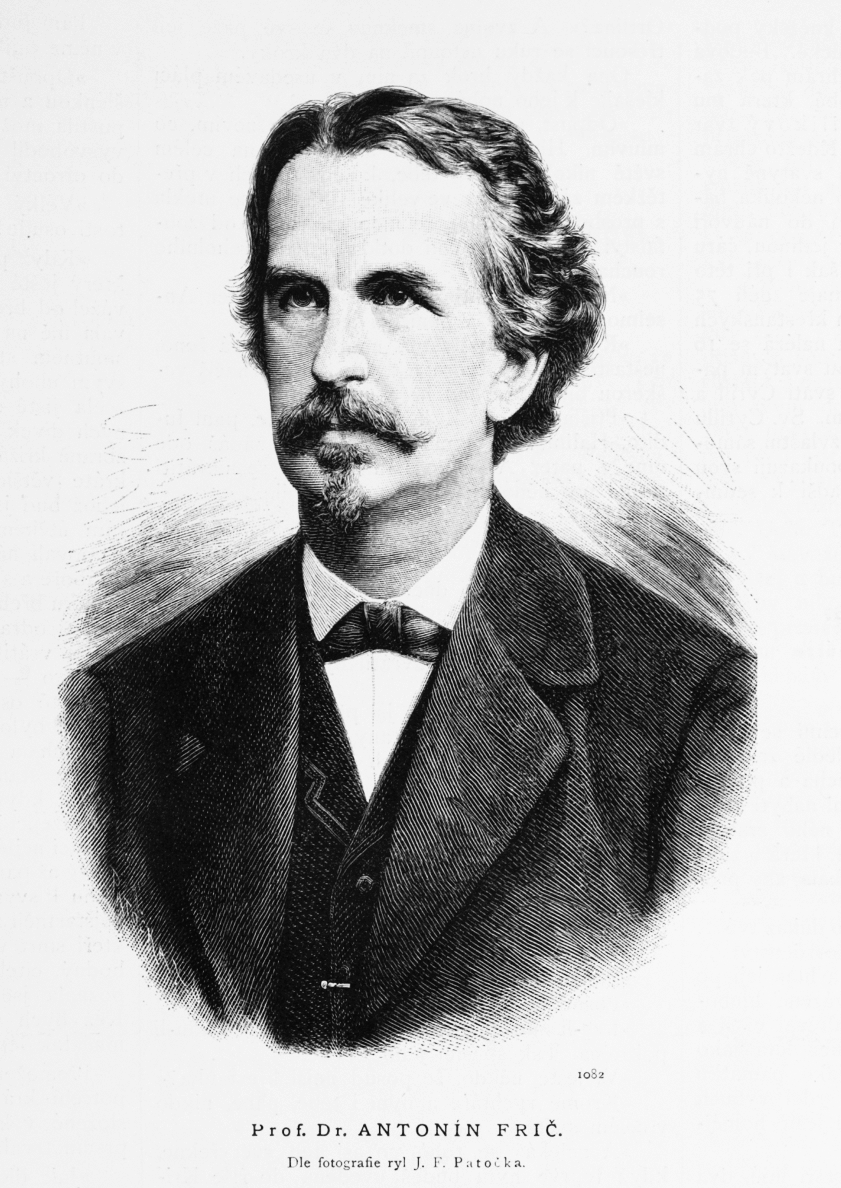
- Frič in 1885
- Born: 30 July 1832; Prague, Bohemia, Austrian Empire
- Died: 15 November 1913 (aged 81); Prague, Bohemia, Austria-Hungary
- Resting place: Olšany Cemetery
- Known for: contributions on the field of permo-carboniferous ecosystems
- Scientific career
- Fields: paleontology
- Institutions: Charles University, National Museum in Prague
- Doctoral students: František Vejdovský

Antonín Jan Frič (German: Anton Johann Fritsch; 30 July 1832 – 15 November 1913) was a Czech paleontologist, biologist and geologist. Professor at the Charles University and later became director of the National Museum in Prague. He became famous for his contributions on the field of Permo-Carboniferous ecosystems.

== Life and work ==
Frič was born in Prague, the second son of Josef Frič (1804–1876), a lawyer and politician who served in the Prague municipal council. His mother Johanna Reisová took an active role in the education of women. His father was a treasurer for the Czech museum (Matice česká from 1842) and he became interested in museums and collections at an early age. His brother Václav Frič became a major natural history collector and dealer. In 1848 Antonin volunteered at the museum under Maxmillian Dormitzer, dealing with collections from Central America made by Augusto Corda. At the age of nineteen he wrote a guide to ordering animal collections. From 1852 he became an unpaid assistant on the recommendation of Jan Evangelista Purkyně. Following his father's request he went to study law at the Charles-Ferdinand University in Prague, but he then decided to move to the natural sciences and in 1854 he studied medicine and qualified in 1863. In 1860 he travelled to London and on his return he gave a talk on the Kensington museum and its activities. After the death of Dormitzer, he succeeded the position at the museum. He received a position in comparative anatomy at the medical faculty in 1864 and became an associate professor in 1871, and ordinary professor in 1881. For the Paris fair of 1867, he was involved in the production of large models of radiolarians based on the illustrations made by Ernst Haeckel. Such models were later sold by his brother Václav. Other interests included birds and he published an illustrated book on the birds of Europe.

Frič also became known for finding fossils once attributed to dinosaurs - Albisaurus albinus and Ponerosteus exogyrarum and so far the only pterosaur known from the Czech Republic, Cretornis hlavaci. The pterosaur was small with a wingspan of about 1.5 m and lived in the Turonian. The first true dinosaur known from the Czech Republic was discovered 90 years after Frič's death (in 2003). It is a small ornithopod of Cenomanian age. In 1884 he described and then repatriated the fossil shining leaf chafer scarab beetle Anomalites fugitivus which had been found in a slab of Süßwasserquarz millstone being carved in Prague. The specimen originated from Nogent-le-Rotrou, France and as a follower of Joachim Barrandes philosophy that fossils primarily belong to their country of origin, he gifted it to the Jardin des plantes, Paris.

trpko jest v krajině bydleti a málo o ní věděti ["it is bitter to live in a country and know little about it"]

— August Emanuel von Reuss (a favourite quote of Frič)

Frič was a proponent of public education through museums and exhibitions. He was involved in organizing an exhibition at the conference of physicians and natural scientists held in Prague in 1882. In 1891 during the Jubilee Exhibition he again organized material on natural history. He became a specialist on museology and by the 1870s was proposing the creation of numerous local museums. In 1903 he had the option to design his own museum in Lázně Bělohrad at the age of 71. He made sketches of his own of the proposed structure on 31 July 1903. Four months later a committee was begun consisting of him, merchant Jindřich Pižl, mayor Václav Vlach and Alois Hoch, then a school principal. Land was allotted at Raisovi Sady and designs were made by Otto Tille, an architect. Alois Hoch became the director upon its opening. In 1912 Frič was made an honoured citizen of Bělohrad and shortly after his death the museum was renamed as the Frič Museum.

Frič received the Lyell Medal from the Geological Society of London in 1902. The fossil gymnosperm genus Fricia was erected by Josef Velenovský in 1885 in Frič's memory.

== Bibliography ==
- Fritsch, Anton (1870). Naturgeschichte der Vögel Europa's (in German). Prag: Tempsky. (in English: "Natural History of European Birds") OCLC 78389133 (all editions)
