= Ptení =

- Municipality
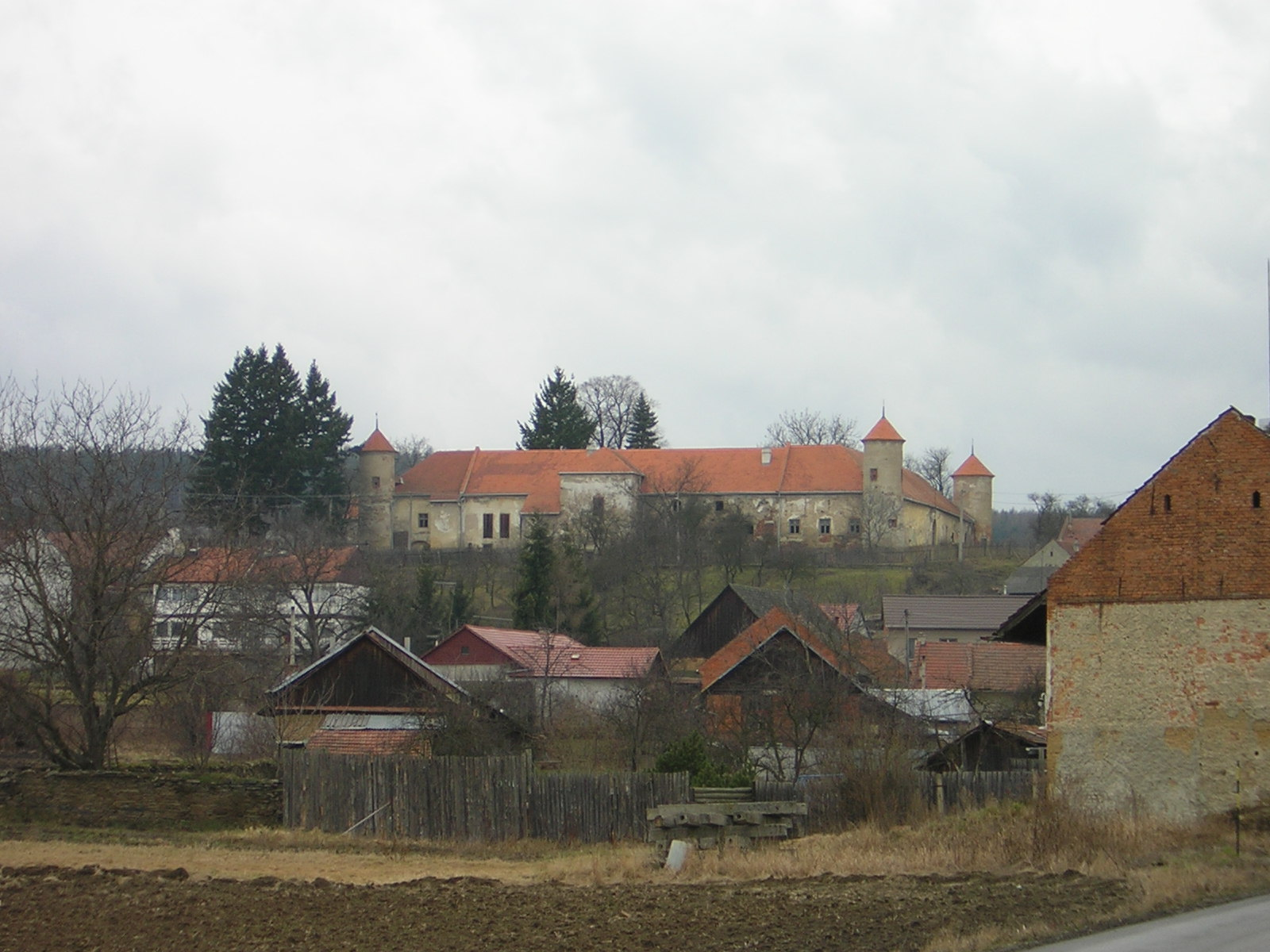
- Ptení Castle

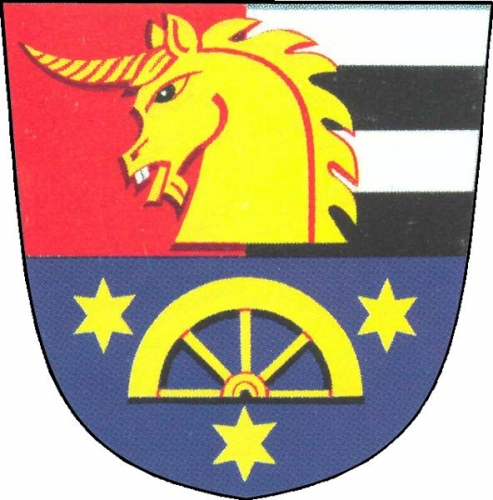
- Flag Coat of arms

- Location in the Czech Republic
- Coordinates: 49°30′40″N 16°57′42″E
- Country: Czech Republic
- Region: Olomouc
- District: Prostějov
- First mentioned: 1141

Area
  - Total: 18.52 km^{2} (7.15 sq mi)
- Elevation: 322 m (1,056 ft)

Population (2026-01-01)
  - Total: 1,099
  - Density: 59.34/km^{2} (153.7/sq mi)
- Time zone: UTC+1 (CET)
  - Summer (DST): UTC+2 (CEST)
- Postal codes: 798 03, 798 43
- Website: www.pteni.cz

Ptení is a municipality and village in Prostějov District in the Olomouc Region of the Czech Republic. It has about 1,100 inhabitants.

Ptení lies approximately 14 kilometres (9 mi) west of Prostějov, 25 km (16 mi) west of Olomouc, and 192 km (119 mi) east of Prague.

== Administrative division ==
Ptení consists of three municipal parts (in brackets population according to the 2021 census):

- Ptení (815)
- Holubice (34)
- Ptenský Dvorek (197)

== Demographics ==
Historical population
Year	Pop.	±%
1869	1,157	—
1880	1,268	+9.6%
1890	1,321	+4.2%
1900	1,329	+0.6%
1910	1,345	+1.2%
1921	1,277	−5.1%
1930	1,327	+3.9%
1950	1,247	−6.0%
1961	1,307	+4.8%
1970	1,213	−7.2%
1980	1,179	−2.8%
1991	1,124	−4.7%
2001	1,114	−0.9%
2011	1,053	−5.5%
2021	1,046	−0.7%
Source: Censuses
