= Václav Frič =

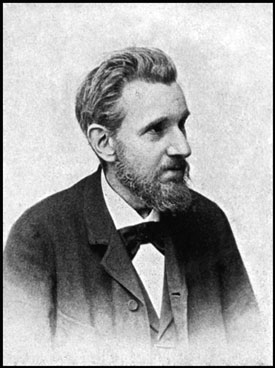
- Born: 14 March 1839; Prague, Bohemia, Austrian Empire
- Died: 10 June 1916 (aged 77); Prague, Bohemia, Austria-Hungary
- Education: Prague Polytechnical Institute
- Known for: Prize-winning exhibitions at fairs
- Spouse: Anna Rottová
- Scientific career
- Fields: Natural history
- Workplaces: Frič's Museum of Natural History; Natural History Institute in Prague

Václav Frič (14 March 1839 – 10 June 1916) was a Czech naturalist and natural history dealer.

Václav Frič was the son of a lawyer Josef Frič (1804–1876). He studied taxidermy then chemistry at the Prague Polytechnical Institute. He had an interest in photography.

Following a visit to London (1859–1860), Frič opened his natural history business in Prague in 1862, supplying botanical, zoological and mineral specimens to museums, educational institutions and private collectors worldwide. He exhibited at trade fairs: the Volksfest in Linz (1863, silver medal), Paris World Fair (1867, bronze medal), Moscow Polytechnic Exhibition (1872, silver medal), Vienna World Fair (1873, honorary medal), again at the Paris World Fair (1878 bronze medal), Australian International Exhibition in Sydney (1879, medal), and yet again at the Paris World Fair (1889 gold medal).

Frič married Anna Rottová, the daughter of a hardware store owner. His first shop was located at Wassergasse 736-II Prague, later Wassergasse 21. Around 1878 the business was moved to "Wladislavsgasse 21a in Prag". It became a "trading natural history museum" first named "Frič's Museum of Natural History" then in 1911 the Natural History Institute in Prague (German: Naturhistorisches Institut in Prag).

His son Jaromír continued the business until the shop finally closed in 1958, when the remaining stock of specimens was donated to the National Museum in Prague.
