= Westbury Formation =

Geological formation in England

- Stratigraphic range: Rhaetian
- Type: Geological formation
- Unit of: Penarth Group
- Underlies: Lilstock Formation
- Overlies: Blue Anchor Formation
- Thickness: 5-10 m

Lithology
- Primary: Mudstone, Shale
- Other: Limestone, Sandstone

Location
- Region: Europe
- Country: United Kingdom

Type section
- Named for: Westbury-on-Severn

The Westbury Formation is a geological formation in England, one of the Penarth Group. It dates back to the Rhaetian. The formation is named after the village of Westbury-on-Severn in Gloucestershire. The remains of a giant shastasaurid and dinosaurs are known from the formation.

== Vertebrate fauna ==
Color key: Taxon / Reclassified taxon / Taxon falsely reported as present / Dubious taxon or junior synonym / Ichnotaxon / Ootaxon / Morphotaxon	Notes; Uncertain or tentative taxa are in small text; ~~crossed out~~ taxa are discredited.

Vertebrates reported from the Westbury Formation
Genus	Species	Location	Stratigraphic position	Material	Notes	Images
Avalonianus	A. sanfordi	Wedmore Hill		"Several now lost teeth."		
Camelotia	C. borealis	Westbury-on-Severn		"Vertebrae, pubis, ischium, femur, tibia, phalanges, adult."	Formerly thought to be postcranial remains of Avalonianus.	Camelotia
Ichthyotitan	I. severnensis	Blue Anchor and Lilstock		Two partial surangulars	Possibly one of the largest marine reptiles.	
Picrodon	P. herveyi	Wedmore Hill		"Tooth."		
Shastasauridae	Indeterminate	Aust		"Three partial specimens."		
Pachystropheus				Several partial postcranial skeletons	A small thalattosaurian marine reptile, youngest known thalattosaur	
Lissodus	L. minimus				A hybodont shark	Lissodus hasleensis
Saurichthys					A pike or gar-like predatory fish	Saurichthys sp.
Sargodon					A dapediiform fish	Sargodon tomicus
Gyrolepis					A ray-finned fish	Gyrolepis albertii
Birgeria					A large predatory fish	
Ceratodus					A lungfish	

== See also ==
- List of dinosaur-bearing rock formations
