= Protodiplatys =

Protodiplatys Temporal range: Callovian–Aptian

Scientific classification
- Domain: Eukaryota
- Kingdom: Animalia
- Phylum: Arthropoda
- Class: Insecta
- Order: Dermaptera
- Family: †Protodiplatyidae
- Genus: †Protodiplatys; Martynov, 1925

Species
- †Protodiplatys fortis Martynov, 1925; †Protodiplatys gracilis Vishnyakova, 1980; †Protodiplatys mongoliensis Vishnyakova, 1986

Extinct genus of earwigs

Protodiplatys is an extinct genus of earwigs, in the family Protodiplatyidae, the suborder Archidermaptera, and the order Dermaptera. It is known from three species, P. fortis and P. gracilis, which are known from the Middle-Late Jurassic Karabastau Formation in Kazakhstan, and P. mongoliensis from the Aptian aged Gurvan-Eren Formation of Mongolia.
