= Dermapteron =

Scientific classification
- Domain: Eukaryota
- Kingdom: Animalia
- Phylum: Arthropoda
- Class: Insecta
- Order: Dermaptera
- Family: †Dermapteridae
- Genus: †Dermapteron; Martynov, 1925
- Species: †D. incerta

Binomial name
- †Dermapteron incerta Martynov, 1925

Extinct species of earwig

Dermapteron incerta is an extinct species of earwig in the family Protodiplatyidae. It is the only species in the genus Dermapteron.
