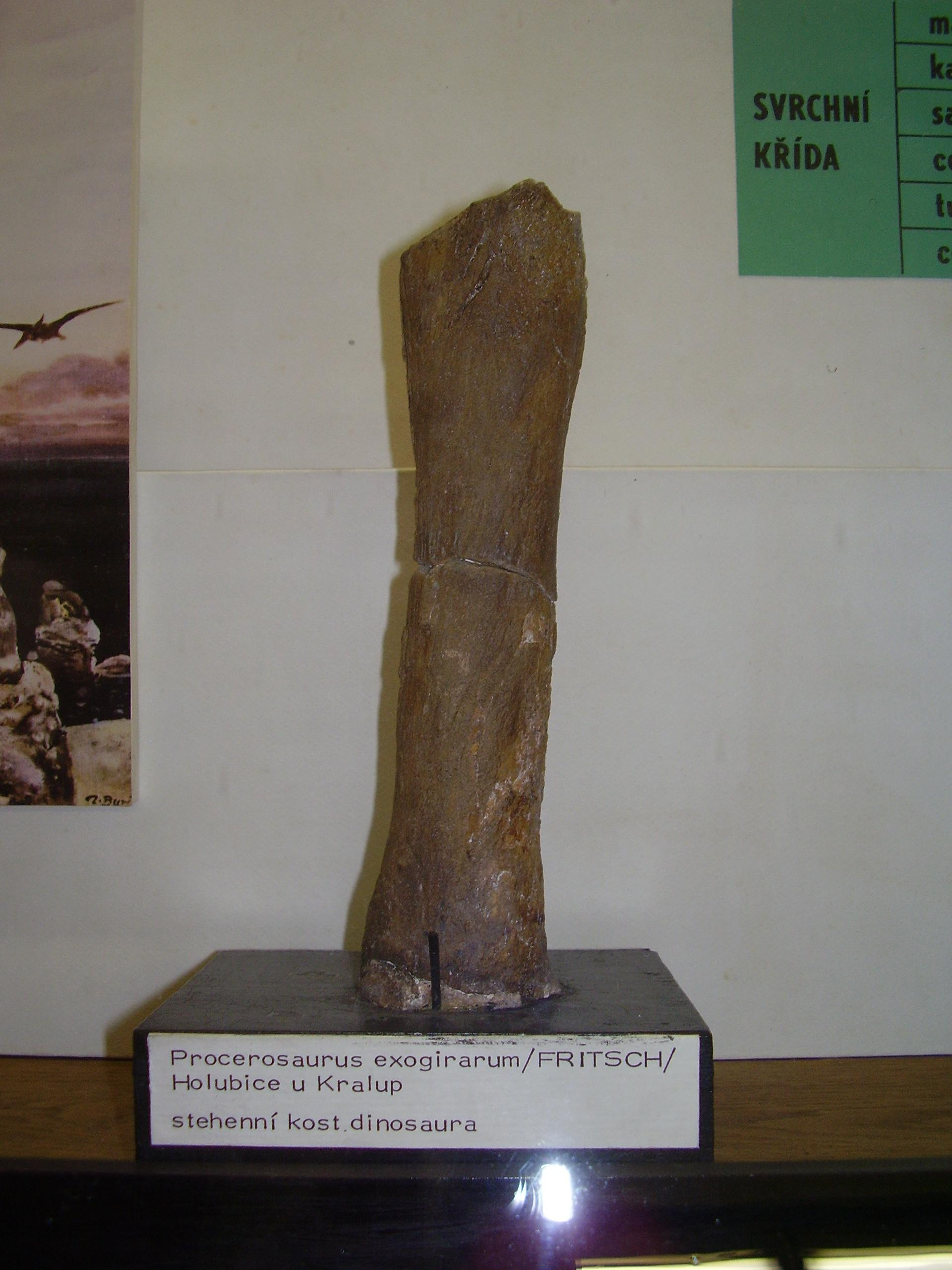
- Holotype tibia of P. exogyrarum (National Museum in Prague)

Scientific classification
- Domain: Eukaryota
- Kingdom: Animalia
- Phylum: Chordata
- Class: Reptilia
- Clade: Archosauromorpha
- Genus: †Ponerosteus; Olshevsky, 2000
- Species: †P. exogyrarum

Binomial name
- †Ponerosteus exogyrarum (Fritsch, 1878)

Synonyms
- Iguanodon exogirarum Fritsch, 1878; Iguanodon exogyrarum (Fritsch, 1878) vide Chure & McIntosh, 1989; Iguanodon exogirarus Brinkmann, 1988; Procerosaurus Fritch, 1905 (preocccupied); Procerosaurus exogirarum Brinkmann, 1988; Procerosaurus exogirarus Brinkmann, 1988

= Ponerosteus =

Ponerosteus Temporal range: Upper Cretaceous, Cenomanian

Extinct genus of reptiles

Ponerosteus is a dubious genus of extinct archosauromorph from the Late Cretaceous (Cenomanian-aged) Korycanar Formation of the Czech Republic that was initially identified as a species of the dinosaur Iguanodon.

The type, and currently only, species is P. exogyrarum.

== Discovery and naming ==
The holotype, NAMU Ob 40, consisting solely of an internal cast of a tibia, was discovered near Holubice, Kralupy nad Vltavou, and was first identified as a dinosaur, which was named "Iguanodon exogirarum" (later "Iguanodon exogyrarum") by Antonín Frič in 1878. He later (1905) renamed it Procerosaurus, unaware that this name was already in use (von Huene, 1902) for what is now a synonym of Tanystropheus. NAMU Ob 40 was renamed Ponerosteus exogyrarum (species name amended) by George Olshevsky in 2000, and Olshevsky considered Ponerosteus to be a nomen dubium; the holotype has since been put on display at the National Museum in Prague.

The name Ponerosteus can be translated as "bad", "worthless", or "useless bone", which describes the fragmentary nature of the holotype.

== Classification ==
Although initially identified as being a dinosaur belonging to the genus Iguanodon, Ponerosteus is currently classified within Archosauromorpha.
