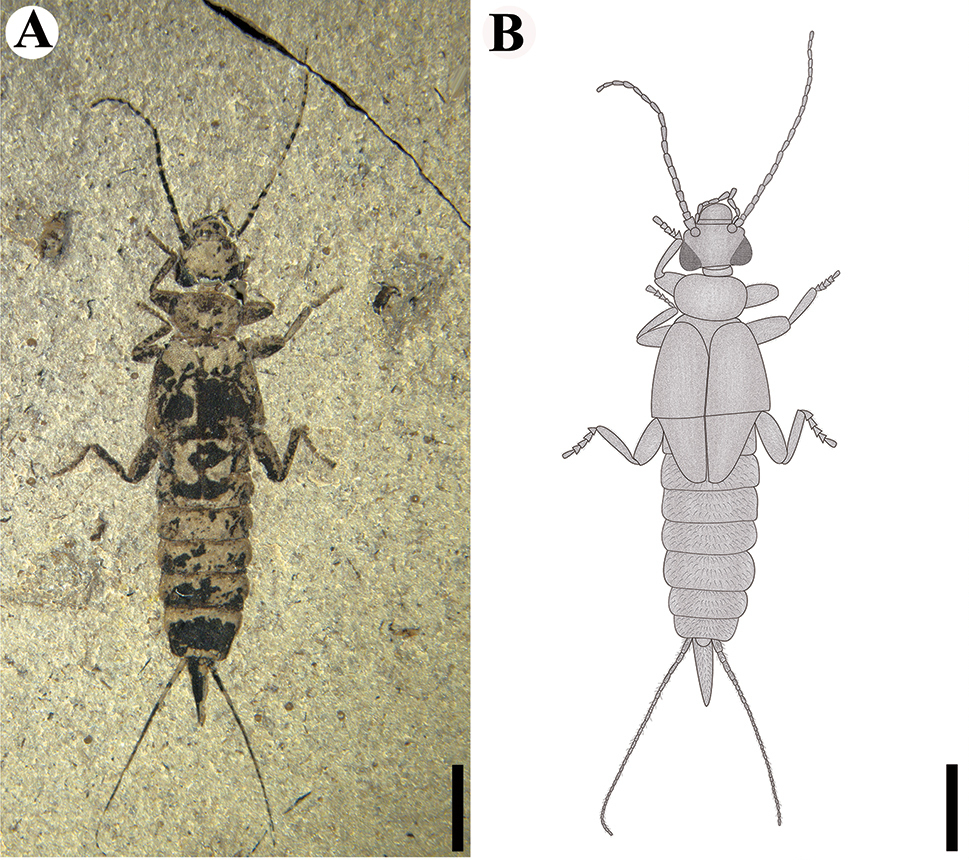
- Aneuroderma oiodes

Scientific classification
- Domain: Eukaryota
- Kingdom: Animalia
- Phylum: Arthropoda
- Class: Insecta
- Order: Dermaptera
- Suborder: †Archidermaptera
- Family: †Protodiplatyidae; Martynov, 1925

Genera
- See text

= Protodiplatyidae =

Protodiplatyidae Temporal range: Bajocian–Aptian

Extinct family of earwigs

Protodiplatyidae is an extinct family of earwigs. It is one of three families in the suborder Archidermaptera, alongside Dermapteridae and Turanovia. Species are known from Jurassic and Early Cretaceous fossils and have unsegmented cerci and tarsi with four to five segments.

== Genera ==
The family includes the following genera:

- Abrderma Xing et al., 2016 - Haifanggou Formation, China, Middle Jurassic (Callovian)
- Aneuroderma Xiong, Engel & Ren, 2021 - Haifanggou Formation, China, Callovian
- Archidermapteron Vishniakova, 1980 - Karabastau Formation, Kazakhstan, Late Jurassic (Oxfordian)
- Asiodiplatys Vishniakova, 1980 - Karabastau Formation, Kazakhstan, Oxfordian
- Barbderma Xing et al., 2016 - Yixian Formation, China, Early Cretaceous (Aptian)
- Longicerciata Zhang, 1994 - Laiyang Formation China, Aptian
- Microdiplatys Vishniakova, 1980 - Karabastau Formation, Kazakhstan, Oxfordian, Itat Formation, Russia, Middle Jurassic (Bathonian)
- Perissoderma Xing et al., 2016 - Haifanggou Formation, China, Callovian
- Protodiplatys Martynov, 1925 - Karabastau Formation, Kazakhstan, Oxfordian, Gurvan-Eren Formation, Mongolia, Aptian
- Sinoprotodiplatys Nel et al., 2012 - Yixian Formation, China, Aptian
