= Microdiplatys =

Scientific classification
- Domain: Eukaryota
- Kingdom: Animalia
- Phylum: Arthropoda
- Class: Insecta
- Order: Dermaptera
- Family: †Protodiplatyidae
- Genus: †Microdiplatys; Vishnyakova, 1980

Species
- See text

Extinct genus of earwigs

Microdiplatys is an extinct genus of earwigs, in the family Protodiplatyidae. It is one of only six genera in the family, its family being the only one in the suborder.

== Species ==
The genus contains only two known species:

- Microdiplatys campodeiformis
- Microdiplatys oculatus
