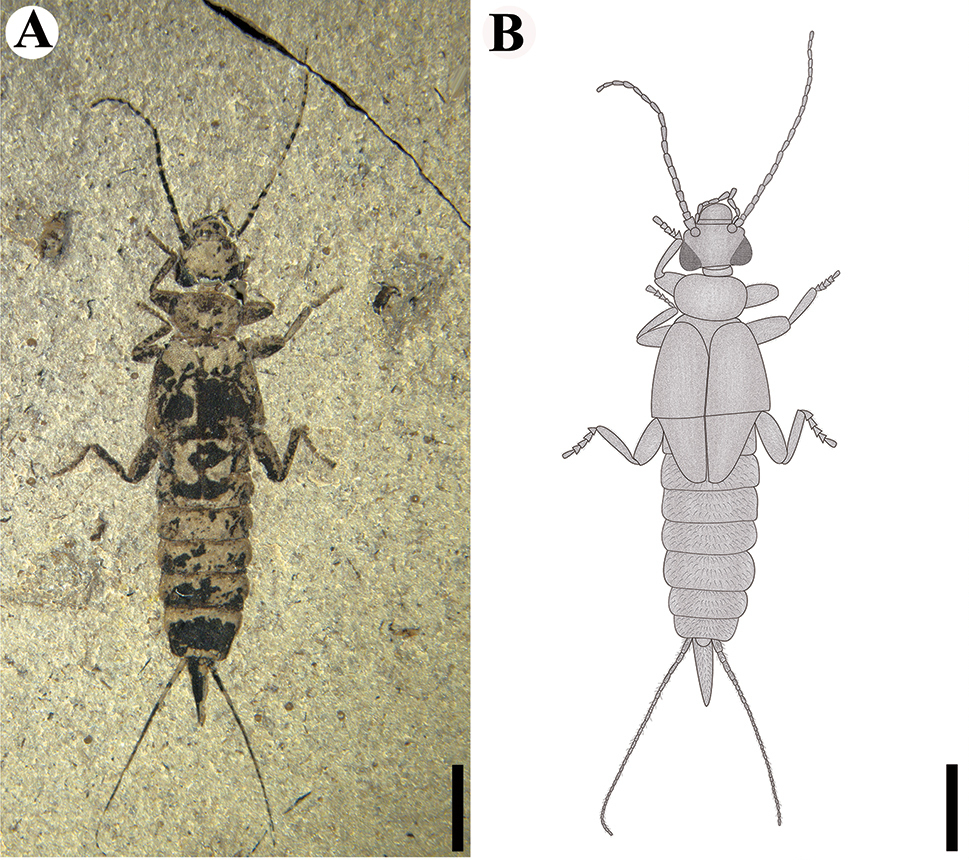
- Aneuroderma oiodes (Protodiplatyidae)
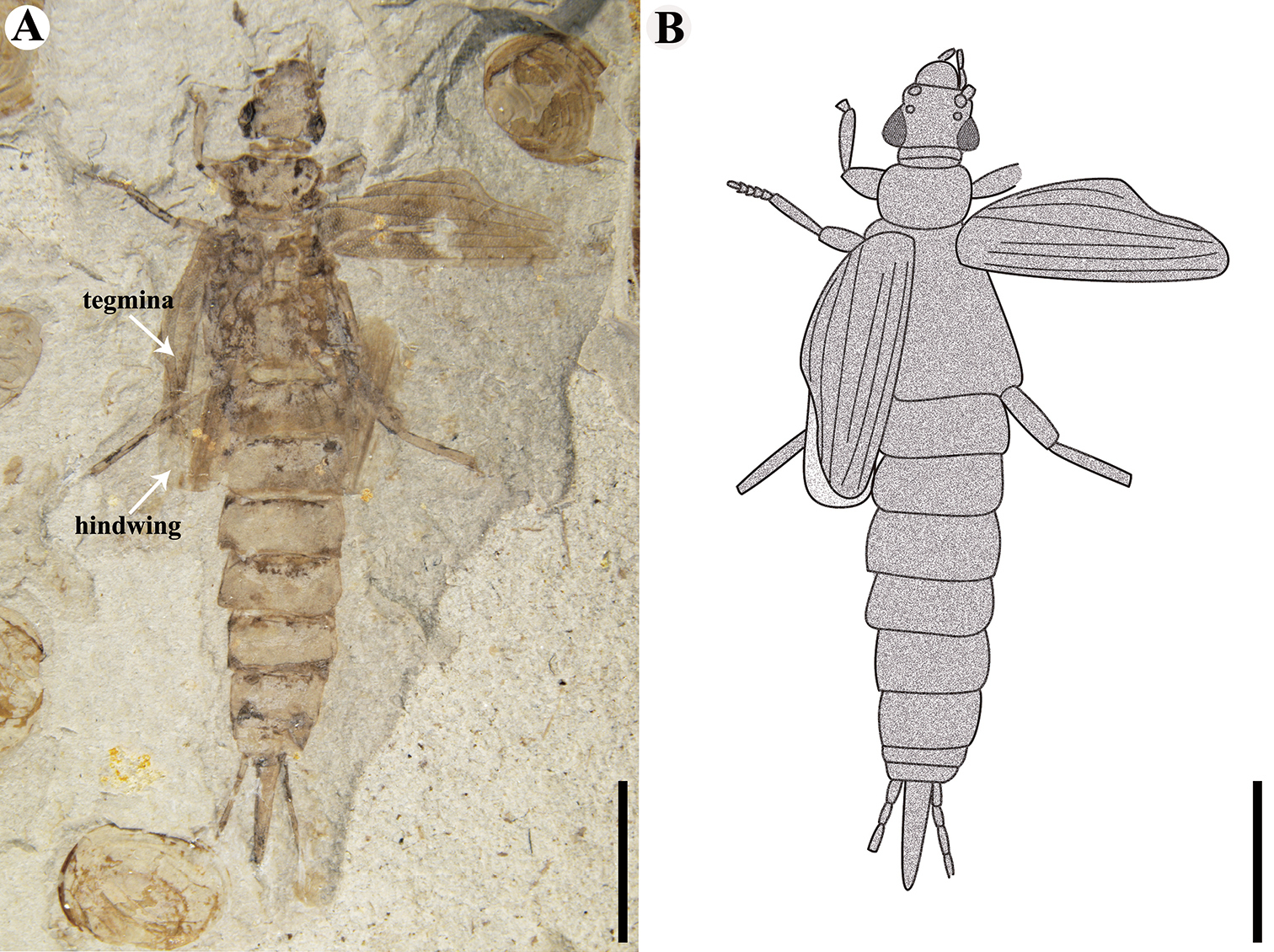
- Sinopalaeodermata concavum (Dermapteridae)

Scientific classification
- Kingdom: Animalia
- Phylum: Arthropoda
- Clade: Pancrustacea
- Class: Insecta
- Order: Dermaptera
- Suborder: †Archidermaptera; Bey-Bienko, 1936

Families
- †Protodiplatyidae; †Dermapteridae; †Turanovia

= Archidermaptera =

Archidermaptera Temporal range: Norian–Aptian

Extinct suborder of earwigs

Archidermaptera is an extinct suborder of earwigs in the order Dermaptera. It is one of two extinct suborders of earwigs, and contains two families (Protodiplatyidae and Dermapteridae) known only from Late Triassic to Early Cretaceous fossils. There has been found that there are researched to be 3 families of Archidermaptera with the Turanoviidae being added. The suborder is classified on the basis of general similarities. The Archidermaptera share with modern earwigs tegmenized forewings, though they lack the distinctive forceps-like cerci of modern earwigs, have external ovipositors, and possess ocelli. The grouping has been suggested to be paraphyletic.

Earwigs are normally ground dwelling and live most of their lives in leafy areas. They have not been known to have high dispersion rates, meaning their habitats are not spread out, leading Archidermaptera to have more of a clumped pattern of dispersion, just like modern earwigs today.

== Genera ==
The three families in this subgroup have 33 species with 19 genera with the genus being listed below:

Protodiplatyidae: Abrderma, Aneuroderma, Archidermapteron, Asiodiplatys, Barbderma, Longicerciata, Microdiplatys, Perissaderma, Protodiplatys, and Sinoprotodiplatys

Dermapteridae: Brevicula, Dacryoderma, Dermapteron, Dimapteron, Palaeodermapteron, Sinopalaeodermata, Trivenapteron, and Valdopteron

Turanoviidae: Turanovia
