= Turanovia =

Turanovia Temporal range: Callovian–Oxfordian

Scientific classification
- Domain: Eukaryota
- Kingdom: Animalia
- Phylum: Arthropoda
- Class: Insecta
- Order: Dermaptera
- Family: †Turanoviidae; Engel, 2003
- Genus: †Turanovia; Vishnyakova, 1980
- Species: †T. incompleta

Binomial name
- †Turanovia incompleta Vishnyakova, 1980

Extinct species of earwig

Turanovia incompleta is an extinct species of archidermapteran earwig. It is the only species in the genus Turanovia and family Turanoviidae. It is found in the Middle-Late Jurassic (Callovian-Oxfordian) Karabastau Formation of Kazakhstan.
