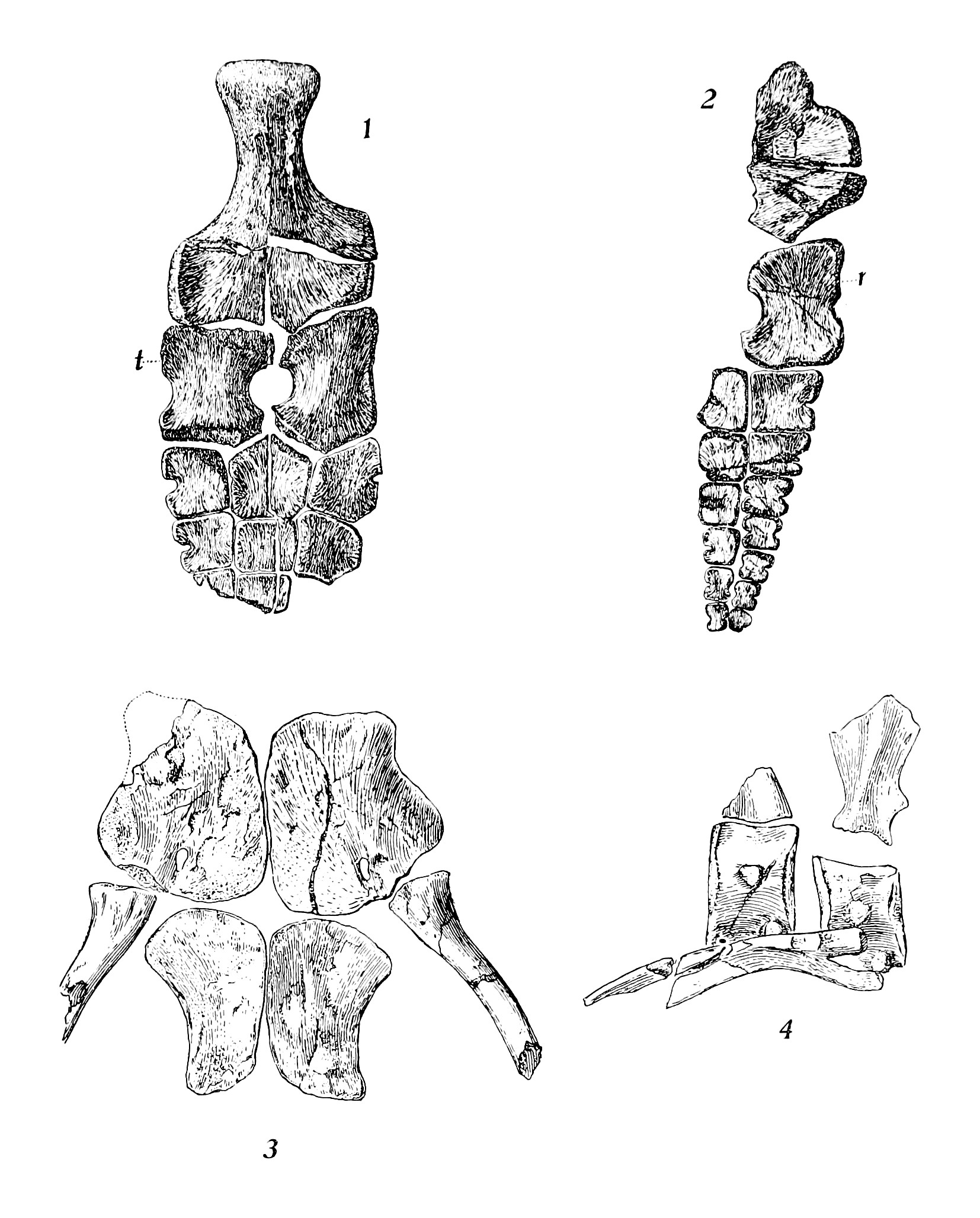
- Clockwise from upper left: hindlimb, forelimb, dorsal vertebrae, and pelvis of T. californicus

Scientific classification
- Kingdom: Animalia
- Phylum: Chordata
- Class: Reptilia
- Order: †Ichthyosauria
- Family: †Toretocnemidae
- Genus: †Toretocnemus; Merriam, 1903

Type species
- †Toretocnemus californicus Merriam, 1903

Other species
- †Toretocnemus zitelli (Merriam, 1903)

Synonyms
- Leptocheirus Merriam, 1903 (preoccupied); Merriamia Boulenger, 1904

= Toretocnemus =

Toretocnemus Temporal range: Late Triassic, 235.0–221.5 Ma

Extinct genus of reptiles

Toretocnemus (meaning 'perforated tibia') is an extinct genus of ichthyosaurs that lived during the Carnian stage of the Upper Triassic in what is now North America. Two species are known, T. californicus and T. zitelli, first described in 1903 by John Campbell Merriam from fossils discovered in the Hosselkus Limestone, Shasta County. The second species was first seen by Merriam as belonging to a distinct genus, but in 1999 it was reclassified into the original taxon. Toretocnemus fossils are primarily known from California, although some specimens are also reported from Alaska and Mexico. With Qianichthyosaurus, the taxon is part of the Toretocnemidae, of which it is also the type genus.

== History of research ==
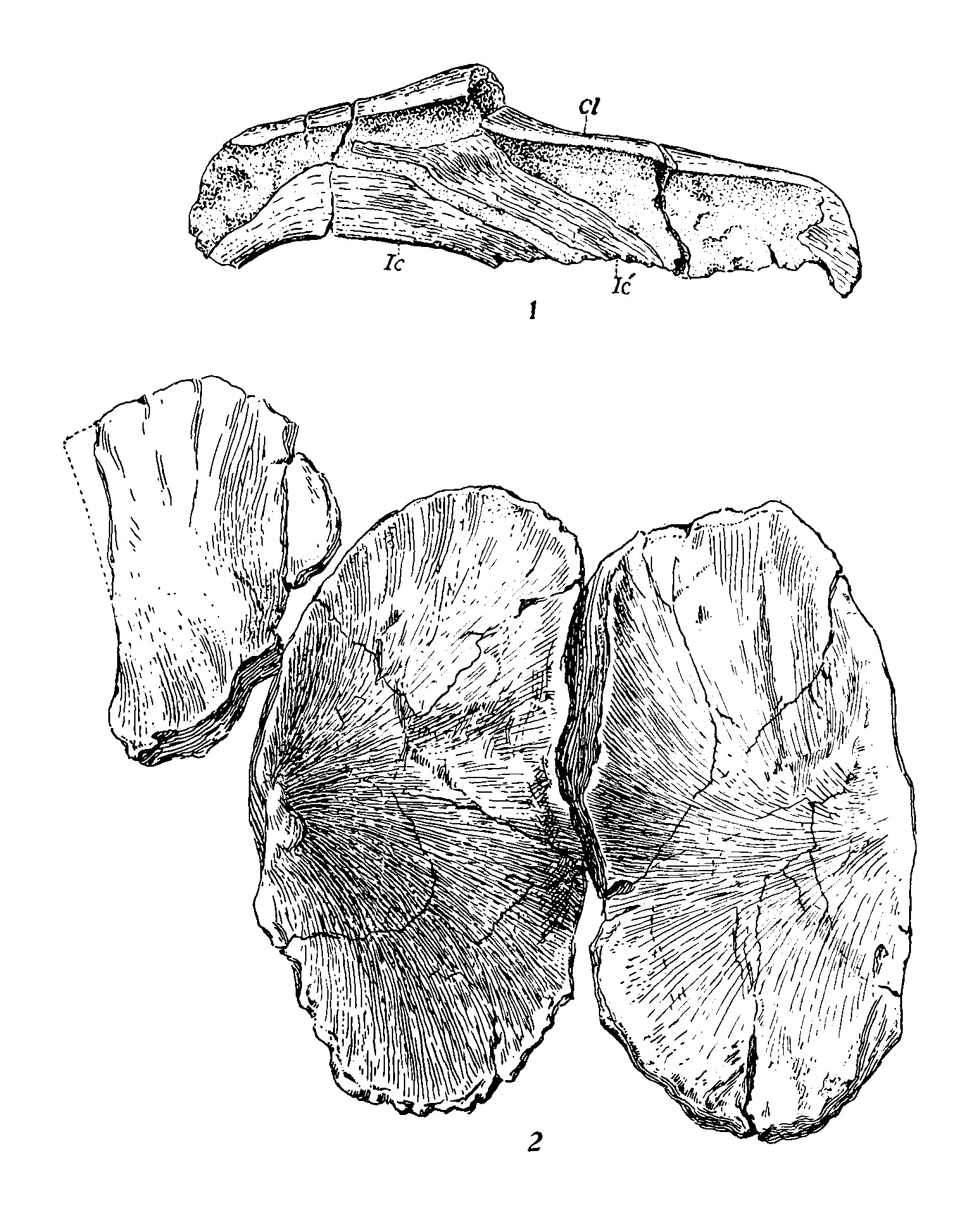
Clavicles and interclavicle (top) and scapula and coracoids (bottom) of T. zitteli

The specimen that would eventually be cataloged as UCMP 8100 was found along the Pit River in Shasta County, California, by Annie Montague Alexander. While much of the specimen had been lost to erosion, many elements were still preserved, namely some skull fragments, around 30 vertebrae, including some dorsal (trunk) vertebrae, but being mostly represented by frontwards caudal (tail) vertebrae, a large number of ribs, the pelvis, the right forelimb, and both the left and right hindlimbs. Another specimen, UCMP 8099, was also found by Alexander in Shasta County. This one was uncovered on a ranch and consisted of a partial skull, various incomplete vertebrae, poorly-preserved ribs, gastralia (belly ribs), the shoulder girdle, forelimbs, and a partial hindlimb. Both of these specimens came from the Trachyceras zone of the Hosselkus Limestone. Alexander gave them, in addition to multiple other fossil reptiles, to the University of California around 1903.

It was John Campbell Merriam who described the genus and its type species Toretocnemus californicus in an article published the same year the fossils were received, also designating specimen UCMP 8100 as the holotype of this taxon. The genus name is derived from Ancient Greek τορητός, ("torētós", "perforated") and κνήμη, ("knḗmē", "shin bone" or "tibia"), all meaning "perforated tibia", while the specific name refers to the state of its discovery. In the same publication, Merriam named another genus and species, Leptocheirus zitteli, for UCMP 8099. For a reason not explained by Merriam, the specific name of this taxon honors the German paleontologist Karl Alfred von Zittel. However, the name Leptocheirus was preoccupied (already in use for something else), and George Albert Boulenger renamed it Merriamia in 1904. In 1908, Merriam noted that there were additional specimens from the same area as the holotype that likely pertained to T. californicus, although these had yet to be prepared.

Noting the multiple anatomical similarities between Toretocnemus and Merriamia and the closeness of their sites of discovery, Ryosuke Motani synonymized the two genera, with the older name Toretocnemus taking precedence. Restudying the specimens, he found that their preservation did not allow for the distinguishing traits proposed by Merriam to be observed properly. However, he tentatively maintained both species (T. californicus and T. zitteli) as valid, as there was little overlapping material between the specimens, complicating comparisons. In 2000, Michael Maisch and Andreas Matzke concurred with this synonymy, also while keeping T. californicus and T. zitteli as separate species.

In 2001, T. californicus vertebrae were found in the Antimonio Formation near the mining town of El Antimonio in Sonora, Mexico. Although ichthyosaur vertebrae are quite commonly found here, most of these were larger shastasaurid vertebrae. The ones found in the Antimonio Formation were much smaller, ranging in diameter from 1.3–2.8 centimeters (0.51–1.10 in). Neural spines were not present, but there were clear grooves for their articulation.

In a 2019 dissertation, Katherine Anderson, together with Patrick Druckenmiller and Jim Baichtal described two specimens from Alaska which they assigned to Toretocnemus. One of these, UAMES 3599, came from the Nehenta Formation on the coastline of Gravina Island. It was found in 1969 and extracted in 2004. The other specimen, UAMES 34994, was found in the Hound Island Volcanics Formation on Hound Island.

== Description ==
Toretocnemus is classified within Ichthyosauria, a group of marine reptiles well-adapted to life underwater. The eyes of ichthyosaurs were large, and their skulls generally bear elongated snouts. Their bodies were streamlined and smooth-skinned, either bearing very small scales or devoid of scales entirely. The limbs of ichthyosaurs are heavily modified into rigid flippers. Additionally, ichthyosaurs are also known to have dorsal fins as well as caudal fins, supported by a downward bend in the tail. Toretocnemus probably did not grow longer than 2 meters (6.6 ft), with some length estimates putting both species at only about 1 meter (3.3 ft), making it a smaller member of the group. In 2019, Anderson and colleagues estimated a total length of under 1.5 meters (4.9 ft) for the Alaskan specimen UAMES 3599.

=== Skull ===
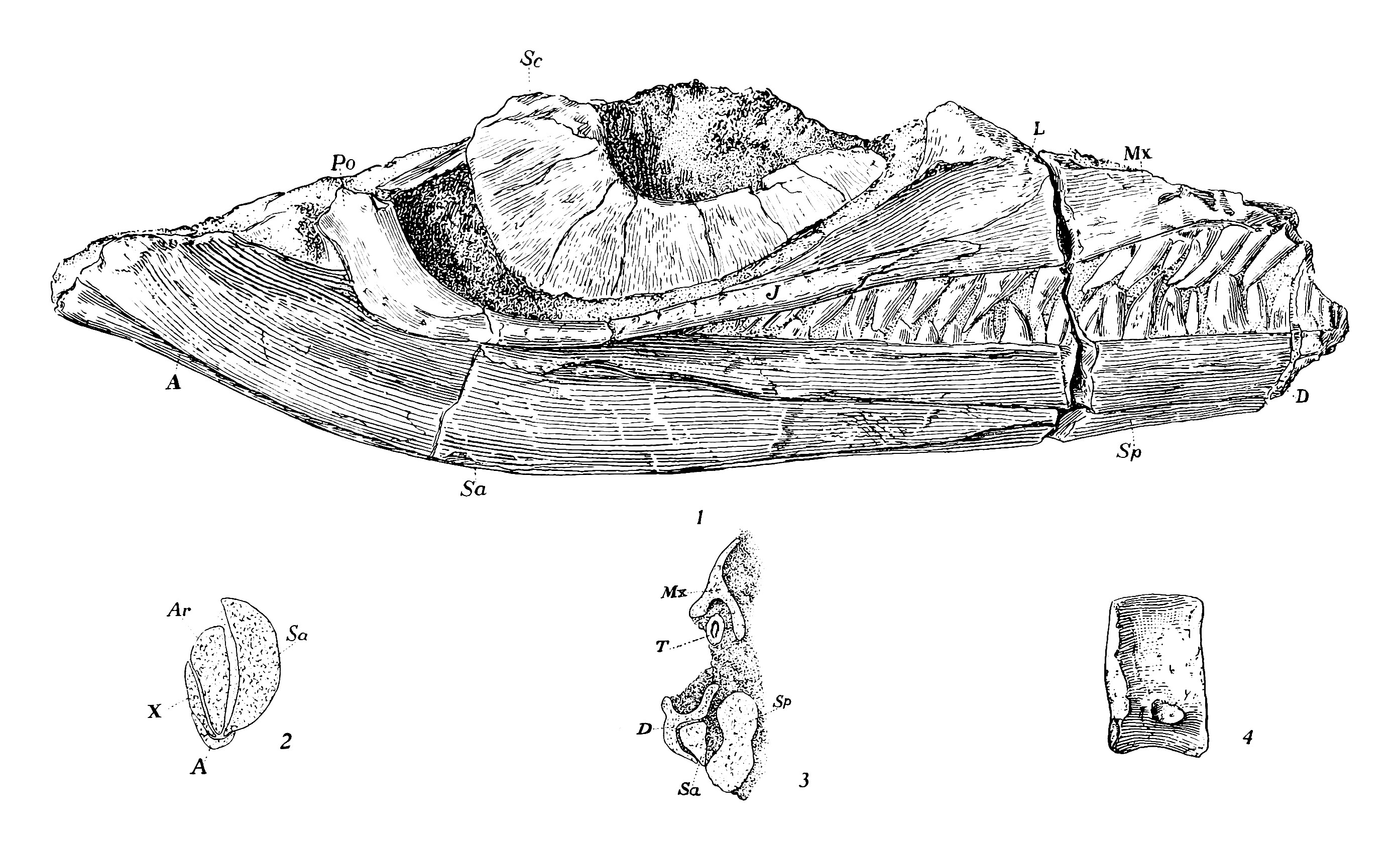
Skull (top) and caudal vertebra (bottom right) of the holotype specimen of T. zitteli

The orbits (eye sockets) of Toretocnemus are very large, with the jugals (a pair of bones which form the underside of each orbit) being narrow. The bony plates making up the scleral ring, a structure housed within the orbit, are very large. The exposure of the angulars (lower rear exterior lower jaw bone) on the outside of the mandible is very limited in size in Toretocnemus, with most of the outer surface of the rear part taken up by the surangular. Both the splenials (a pair of inner mandibular bones) and the articulars (mandibular bones involved in the jaw joint) are enlarged in Toretocnemus, especially in the case of the latter. The teeth of Toretocnemus are all the same shape and erupt from a groove.

=== Vertebrae and ribs ===
The hindmost dorsal vertebrae in T. californicus have neural spines that curve backwards and notches in the place of zygapophyses (two pairs of forwards- or backwards-directed projections). The thin neural arches of T. californicus bear thin ridges on their sides. While the dorsal centra have similar lengths and heights in T. zitteli, T. californicus has centra that are much less elongated. The dorsal centra are taller than wide, and both their front and back faces are concave (amphicoelous). The parapophyses and diapophyses on the dorsal vertebrae, projections that articulate with the ribs, are small and separate in T. californicus with considerable space in between them; a characteristic feature of the genus. Both the front and back faces of the dorsal ribs of Toretocnemus bear grooves along much of their length, barring their lower ends. The only well-preserved dorsal rib head of T. zitteli is not bifurcated; conversely, the dorsal rib heads of T. californicus are strongly bifurcated in the middle to rear part of the torso. The rib heads located further forwards on the vertebral column of T. californicus are more prominently bifurcated. T. zitteli has five sets of gastralia.

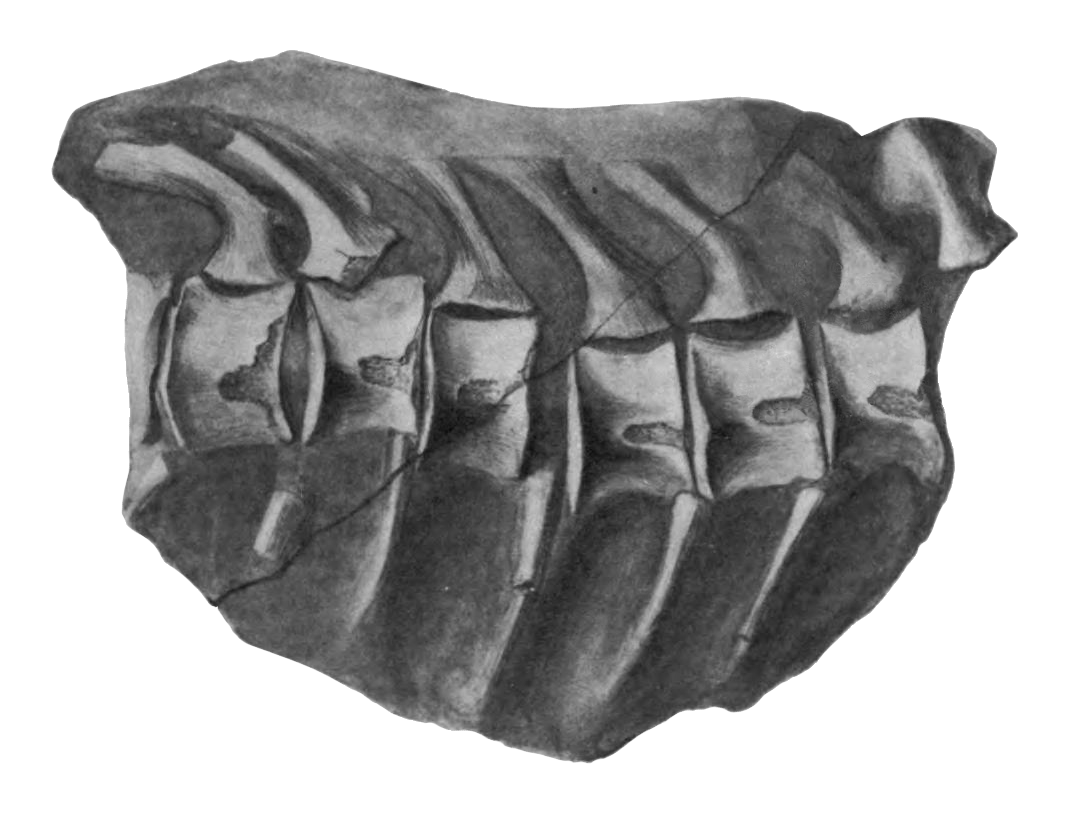
Caudal vertebrae of T. californicus

The neural spines (upwards projections on the vertebrae) of the caudal vertebrae are highly elongate in Toretocnemus. In T. californicus, the caudal vertebrae have straighter neural spines and longer zygapophyses than the dorsal vertebrae; these caudal vertebrae also have very tall diapophyses. All of the caudal centra in this species are amphicoelous. The caudal ribs of T. californicus, unlike the dorsal ribs, do not have bifurcated heads. T. zitteli has long caudal vertebrae. The only known caudal centrum of T. zitteli in good condition is from the front part of the tail, wider than it is tall, and amphicoelous. The sides of the centrum are not bowed outwards, and the vertebral body has a six-sided cross-section. The downward bend in the tail of Toretocnemus is weak, and formed by caudal centra with longer tops than bottoms, giving them a wedge-like shape. In 2019, Anderson and colleagues found the angle of the bend would have been at least 6.45 degrees. The diapophyses extend out far to the sides and the facets for the chevrons are well-demarcated. The elongated chevrons of T. californicus are shaped like the letter Y.

=== Appendicular skeleton ===
The rounded coracoids of T. zitteli are twice as long as wide and do not have any concavities along their edges. Their inner sides are more robust than their outer sides. A hook-like projection is present on the front edges of the short scapulae (shoulder blades). The surfaces on the scapulae that the coracoids and humeri articulate with are separate. The lower ends of the scapulae shoulder blades are widened. The clavicles (collarbones), which contact each other, are also quite broad. Merriam tentatively identified a triangular bone as the interclavicle of T. zitteli. The putative interclavicle is small and its backwards projection is very short. The long upper hip bone, the ilium, is quite narrow in T. californicus. The pubic bones and ischia (lower hip bones) of T. californicus are flat and each pair are in extensive contact along the midline. The wide pubic bones (front lower hip bones) of T. californicus are each perforated by a small hole known as an obturator foramen, similar to Cymbospondylus. The ischia are not as wide as those of Shastasaurus.

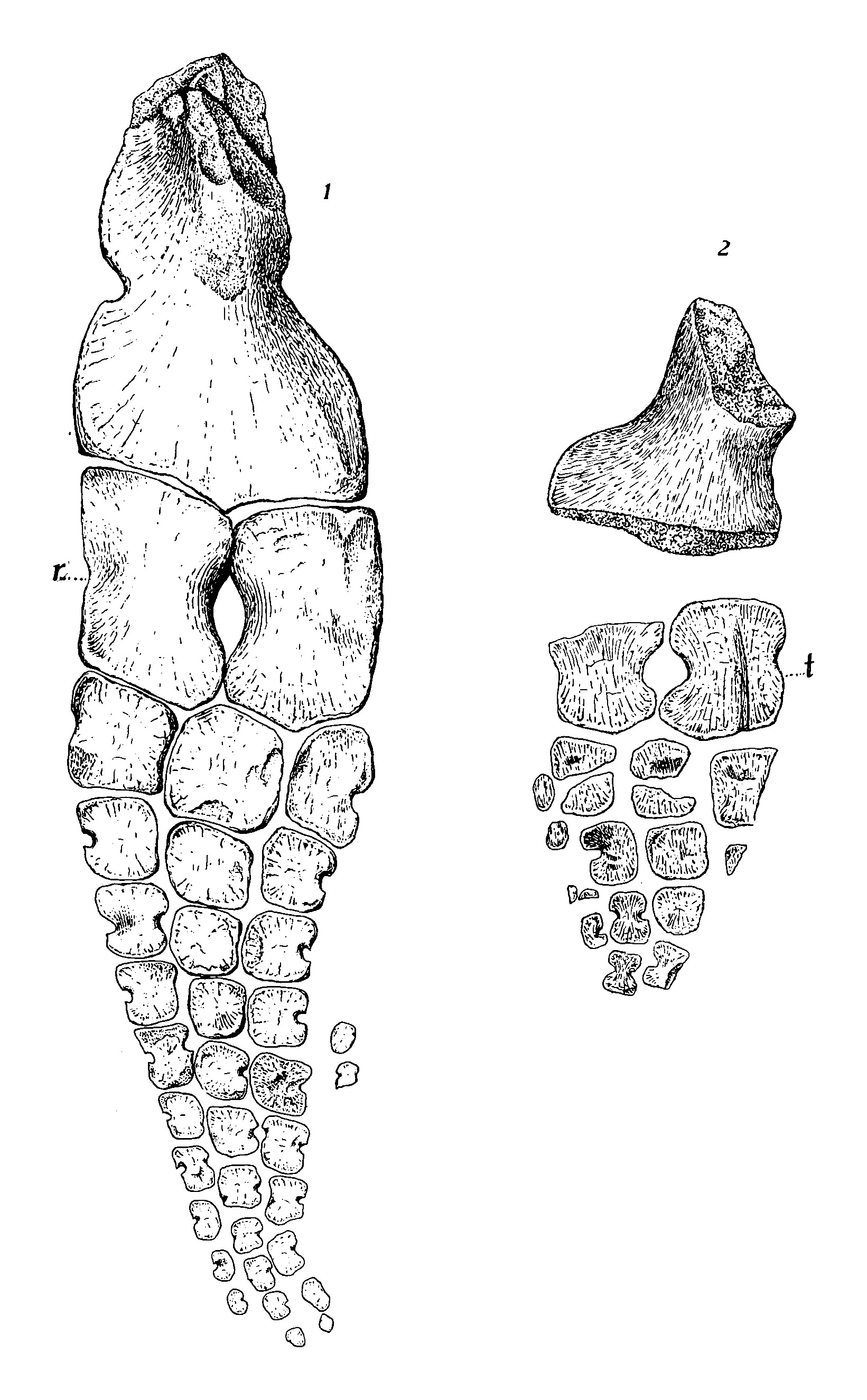
Forelimb (left) and partial hindlimb (right) of T. zitteli

The two species of Toretocnemus have similar limbs. In 1903, Merriam stated that the forelimbs of T. zitteli are longer than its hindlimbs, while the hindlimbs or T. californicus are at least as long as its forelimbs, if not even longer. However, in 1999, Motani pointed out that as both specimens are disarticulated and incomplete, it cannot be confirmed that the limbs assigned to each specimen all came from the same individual, therefore this difference is of dubious utility. The upper and lower limb bones of both species are very elongate. Toretocnemus has a narrow humerus (upper arm bone) with a broad lower end; this bone being twice as long as the radius. The upper end of the humerus is roughly flush with the front of the bone, while the rear edge of the humerus is diagonal. There is a well-defined notch halfway down the front edge of the humerus, a notch is also present on the bone's rear edge but is not as strongly demarcated. The surfaces of the facets for the lower arm bones are bowed inwards. The upper end of the humerus in T. zitteli bears a ridge half the length of the humerus on both its top face and underside, though the one on the underside is larger. Another upraised area of the humerus is complemented by a similar structure on the ulna.

An opening is present between the lower limb bones (epipodials) of both species. Both the inner and outer edges of the radius are concave, but only the inner edge of the ulna is notched. While poorly known, the forelimbs of T. californicus appear similar to those of T. zitteli, though the radius of T. californicus is moderately broader than that of T. zitteli and the notches on the forelimb bones of the former are more pronounced. The carpals (wrist and ankle bones) of T. zitteli are set into two rows of three. Only one carpal connects to the lower edge middle upper wrist bone, the intermedium. The intermedium of contacts the ulna more extensively than the radius, as the radiale is broader than the ulnale (front and back upper wrist bones, respectively). The carpals (digit bones) of Toretocnemus forming the outer margins of the flippers all bear notches on at least their outwards-facing edges. Both the front and back edges of the metacarpal of the frontmost digit bear notches.

Each limb of Toretocnemus has three main digits and an additional very small fourth one. The outer two main digits of the forelimbs of T. zitteli each consist of seven phalanges while the middle one has eight. Due to the very delicate nature of the phalanges at the tips of the digits, Merriam considered it unlikely that any more than two were missing. Both sides of all of the phalanges in the frontmost digit of the forelimbs in T. californicus are notched, as are all of those in the digit immediately behind it save for the uppermost phalanx. Among the phalanges of T. zitteli, only the first of the middle primary digit and some of the terminal phalanges bear no notches. All notched phalanges in the middle digit in the foreflipper of T. zitelli have exclusively rear-facing notches. Some of the phalanges in the outer primary digits are doubly notched, and all bear notches on their outwards-facing edges. Only two very reduced phalanges are known in the accessory digit in the forelimbs of T. zitteli, though more may have been present. These phalanges are located near the upper regions of the other digits.

The elongated portion (shaft) of the femur (thigh bone) of Toretocnemus is narrow, but the lower end of the bone is very wide. The middle part of the femur is twisted, and the length of the bone is roughly twice that of the tibia and fibula. The upper end of the femur bears a large, projecting shelf on its top side, while the lower end of the femur is bowed inwards where it attaches to the shin bones. The tibia (front shin bone) is wider than the fibula (rear shin bone), and the fibula is not angled backwards beyond the femur. The rear edge of the fibula is straight, unlike the concave margins of the tibia and the fibula's front. The tibiae and fibulae of T. zitteli bear notches on both their front and back sides; the former of these bones being wider. Like the carpals, the tarsals (wrist and ankle bones) of T. zitteli are set into two rows of three. Many of the tarsals of T. californicus are quadrangular in outline, although the middle upper tarsal is pentagonal. The tarsals above the frontmost digit are notched on their front edges. Those above digit III, however, are not notched, and neither is its metatarsal. The rear edge of tarsal beneath the fibula (fibulare) is very weakly notched. The middle lower tarsal of T. zitteli has convex edges, while the one immediately behind it has a large indentation on its rear edge. The metacarpals below them are similar in shape, though the rearmost of them has a front-facing notch in addition to a rear-facing one. The fibulare of T. californicus, in addition to the tarsal below it, bear surfaces for the attachment of an accessory digit. The digital configuration of the hindlimbs in T. zitteli is similar to that of the forelimbs. The accessory digits in the hindlimbs of T. zitteli are better developed than those of the forelimbs, being composed of four bones each and originating behind the tarsus.

== Classification ==
In 1903, Merriam was uncertain how to classify Toretocnemus. He considered T. zitteli (then Leptocheirus) to be quite similar to Mixosaurus, but differing markedly in dental and appendicular anatomy; and noted that T. californicus bore similarities with T. zitteli, Shastasaurus, and Ichthyosaurus. In 1904, Boulenger believed there to be three main lineages of ichthyosaurs; one leading to wide-finned Ichthyosaurus species, another to narrow-finned Ichthyosaurus (referred to as Proteosaurus), and a third to Ophthalmosaurus. Toretocnemus and Merriamia (T. zitteli) were considered to belong to the second lineage. In 1908, Merriam proposed a tentative classification scheme for ichthyosaurs. He considered the Triassic species to all belong to Mixosauridae, which was divided into the subfamilies Mixosaurinae and Shastasaurinae, with Merriamia placed within the latter group. T. californicus was also classified as shastasaurine due to its limbs being similar to those of Merriamia, though Merriam was more cautious with this species as its double-headed ribs seemed to contradict such a placement.

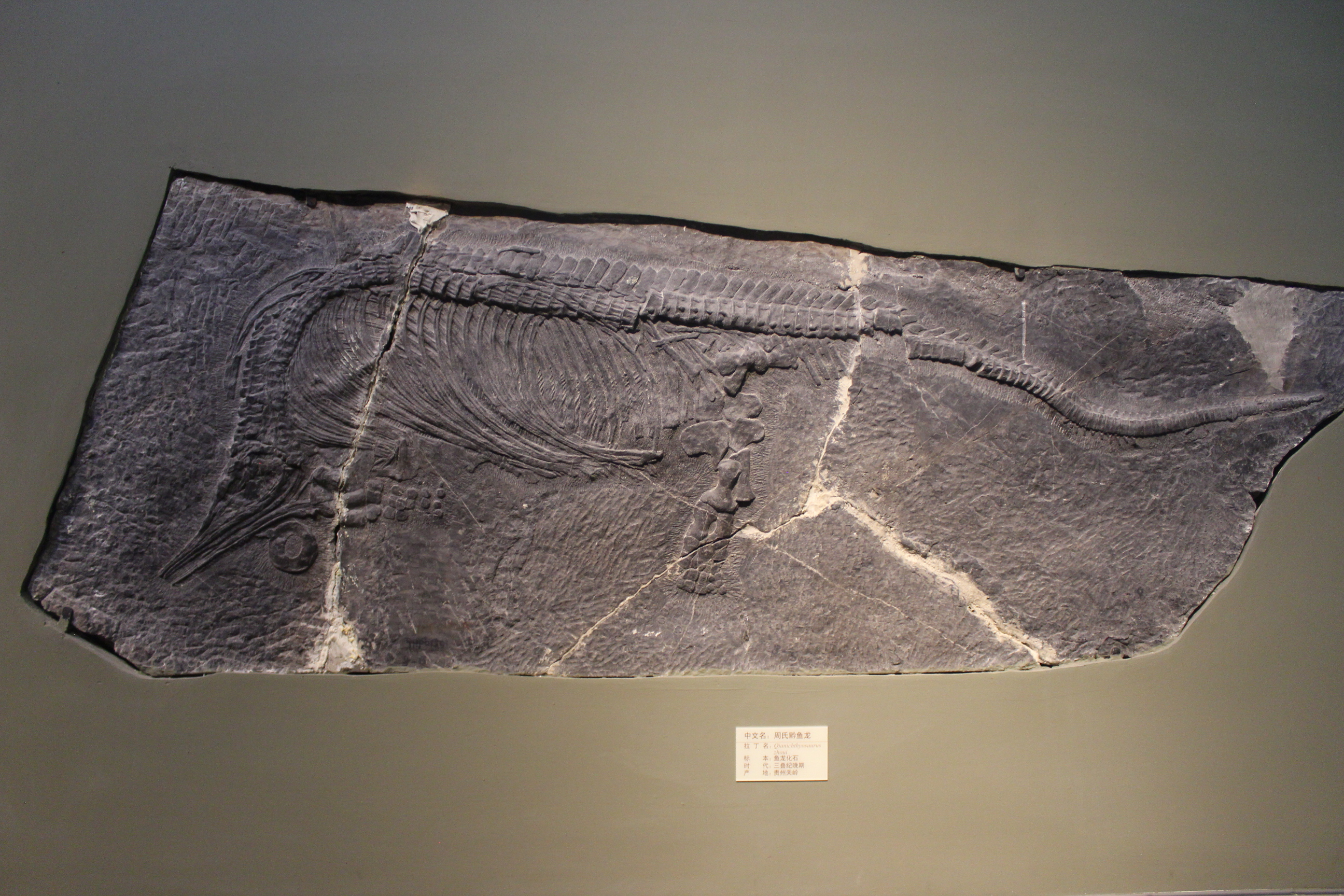
Specimen of Qianichthyosaurus zhoui, a relative of Toretocnemus

In 1923, however, Friedrich von Huene classified ichthyosaurs in a different manner, splitting them into the longipinnates and latipinnates based on the number of digits they possessed, the longipinnates having fewer. Both of these lineages were thought to have diverged in the Triassic and persisted into the Cretaceous. von Huene considered Toretocnemus to belong to the longipinnates, on the line leading to Stenopterygius, Platypterygius, and Nannopterygius.

In 1999, Motani recovered Toretocnemus within Euichthyosauria, along with Californosaurus and Parvipelvia, rather than among the shastasaurids where it was traditionally placed. In 2000, Maisch and Matzke named a new family, Toretocnemidae to unite Toretocnemus and Qianichthyosaurus. They found this group to be the first to diverge within Longipinnati, a larger group including Cymbospondylus and parvipelvians, among other taxa. In 2003, Elizabeth Nicholls and colleagues described a nearly complete skeleton of Qianichthyosaurus and found many similarities with Toretocnemus. They concurred that the two were sister taxa within Toretocnemidae. A 2016 analysis by Cheng Ji and colleagues found Torteocnemus and Qianichthyosaurus to be united within Toretocnemidae, though they found this group to be within Euichthyosauria. In 2017, Benjamin Moon conducted multiple comprehensive analyses of ichthyosaur relationships. Toretocnemus was repeatedly found to be a well-supported clade (natural group including all descendants of an ancestor), but while it was frequently found within Euichthyosauria, it was not recovered as the sister taxon of Qianichthyosaurus. One of his results, however, did find Toretocnemus in a clade with Qianichthyosaurus, Californosaurus, Wimanius, and Phalarodon major, though this grouping was without much support.

Consensus tree from Bindellini et al., 2021:

- Ichthyosauria
  - Cymbospondylidae
  - Hueneosauria
    - Mixosauridae
    - Merriamosauria
      - Besanosaurus
      - - Guizhouichthyosaurus
        - - "Callawayia" wolonggangense
          - - Guanlingsaurus
            - - Shastasaurus
              - - - Shonisaurus popularis
                  - Shonisaurus sikanniensis
                - - Callawayia
                  - - Californosaurus
                    - - Parvipelvia
                      - Toretocnemidae
                        - Qianichthyosaurus zhoui
                        - Qianichthyosaurus xingyiensis
                        - Toretocnemus

Preferred topology of Sander et al., 2021:

- - Cymbospondylidae
  - - Mixosauridae
    - - - Toretocnemus zitteli
        - Toretocnemus californicus
      - - Phantomosaurus neubigi
        - Californosaurus perrini
        - - Qianichthyosaurus zhoui
          - - Wimanius odontopalatus
            - Qianichthyosaurus xingyiensis
        - - Besanosaurus leptorhynchus
          - - Shastasauridae
            - - Quasianosteosaurus vikinghoegdai
              - - Euichthyosauria
                  - Callawayia neoscapularis
                  - Parvipelvia
                - - Guizhouichthyosaurus wolonggangense
                  - - Guizhouichthyosaurus tangae
                    - - Shonisaurus popularis
                      - Mikadocephalus gracilirostris

== Palebiology ==
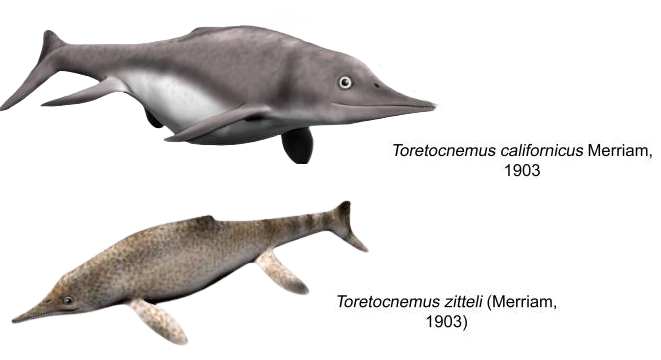
Life restorations of the two known species of Toretocnemus

As a result of their skeletons losing much of their supporting structure, ichthyosaurs would have been unable to move around on land, instead spending their entire lives in the water, though they were still air-breathers. Unlike modern, poikilothermic ("cold-blooded") reptiles, ichthyosaurs had high metablisms and were homeotherms, able to maintain constant body temperatures. As ichthyosaurs could not go onto land to lay eggs (reptile eggs will drown underwater), they gave birth to live young underwater. Triassic ichthyosaurs may have been ambush predators as they were not as efficient swimmers as their later relatives. The large eyes of ichthyosaurs indicate that vision was an important sense, and as their nostrils led to their mouths rather than lungs, they could scent prey and other animals underwater.

In 1908, Merriam considered Triassic ichthyosaurs such as Toretocnemus to have used their limbs for propulsion when swimming in addition to their tails. However, further study and comparisons with fish have cast doubt on the usage of ichthyosaur limbs as paddles. Instead, they probably served to keep the animal upright and make turns, any propulsive function limited to slow swimming. Ichthyosaurs would have propelled themselves forwards by beating their tails back and forth, a more efficient method for sustained swimming. The front edge of the limb of T. zitteli would have marginally more muscle power than its rear edge, thanks to the placement of the upper end of the humerus relative to its lower end.

== Paleoenvironment ==
While once proposed to have been closely connected to Nevada, the discovery of Toretocnemus in the Mexican Antimonio Formation led Lucas to argue in 2002 that the Antimonio Terrane instead had once been connected to the East Klamath Terrane, a piece of tectonic plate upon which the Hosselkus Limestone was deposited. Lucas noted that unlike most of the fauna of the Antimonio Formation, Toretocnemus had a very limited distribution, unknown from Nevada. As to why Toretocnemus was only known from such a small geographic area despite being a mobile creature, Lucas speculated that it may not have been a very strong open-ocean swimmer due to its small size. However, Lucas noted that if Qianichthyosaurus was synonymous with Toretocnemus then this supposed paleobiological link would be much weaker.

== See also ==
- List of ichthyosaurs
- Timeline of ichthyosaur research
