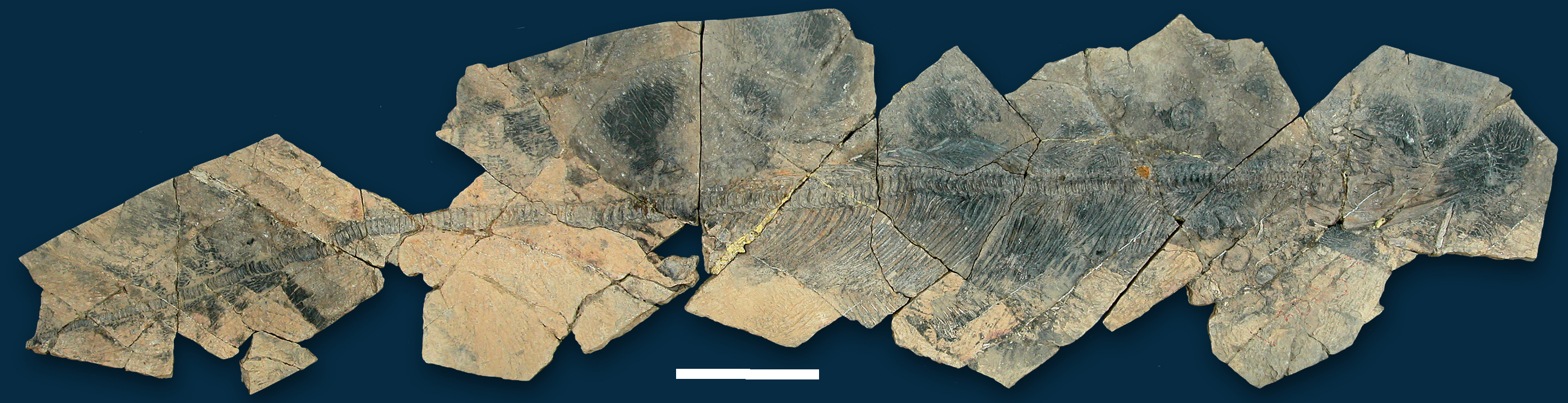
- Juvenile specimen YGMIR SPCV03108

Scientific classification
- Kingdom: Animalia
- Phylum: Chordata
- Class: Reptilia
- Superorder: †Ichthyopterygia
- Order: †Ichthyosauria
- Suborder: †Longipinnati
- Node: †Merriamosauria
- Family: †Shastasauridae
- Genus: †Guanlingsaurus; Yin et al., 2000

Type species
- †Guanlingsaurus liangae Yin et al., 2000

Synonyms
- Typicusichthyosaurus tsaihuae? Yin et al., 2000

= Guanlingsaurus =

Guanlingsaurus Temporal range: Late Triassic, 235.0–227 Ma

Extinct genus of reptiles

Guanlingsaurus is an extinct genus of shastasaurid ichthyosaur from the Late Triassic of China. It grew up to 8.3 metres (27 ft) in length and has a wide, triangular skull with a short and toothless snout.

== Discovery ==
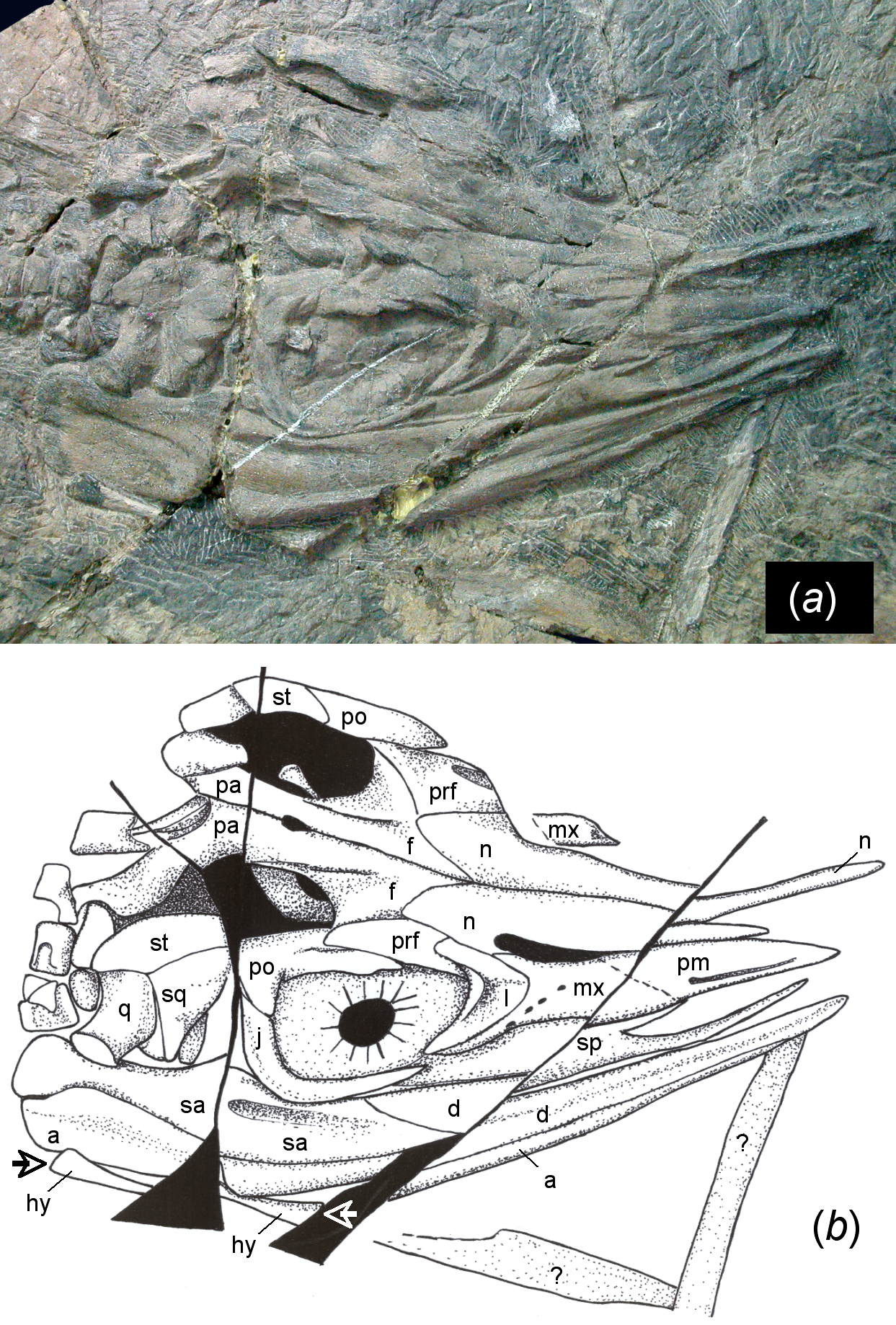
Skull of specimen YGMIR SPCV03108

It is known from a single species, Guanlingsaurus liangae, that was found in the Carnian-age Falang Formation of Guanling County, which is in the province of Guizhou. The genus and species were first named in 2000 on the basis of an incomplete adult skeleton. More complete skeletons were described in 2011, and a complete skeleton belonging to a juvenile was described in 2013. In 2011 Guanlingsaurus liangae was reassigned to the genus Shastasaurus, which includes two species from North America that are known from more complete fossils than Guanlingsaurus. However, the description of the juvenile specimen in 2013 revealed several features that make G. liangae distinct from Shastasaurus species, and the name was reinstated.

== Description ==
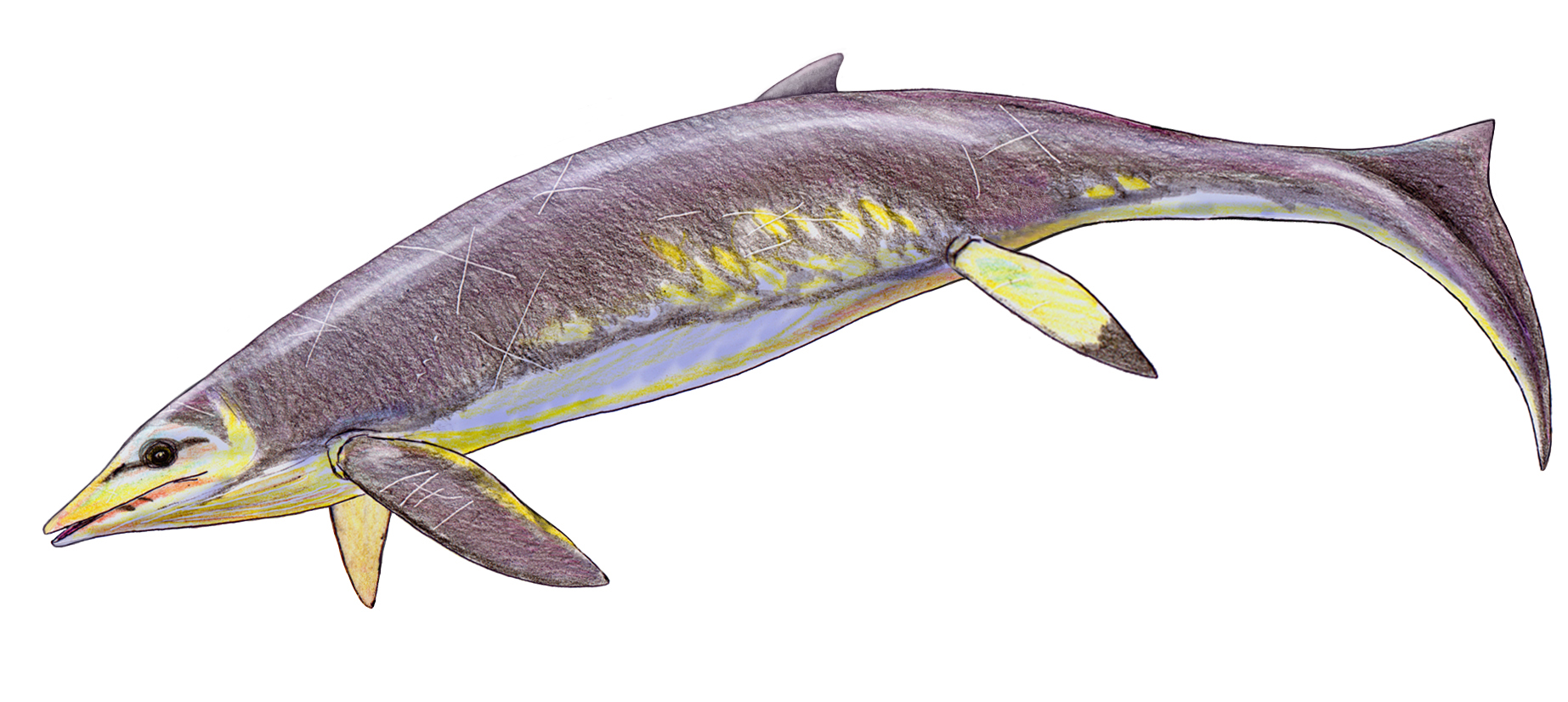
Life restoration

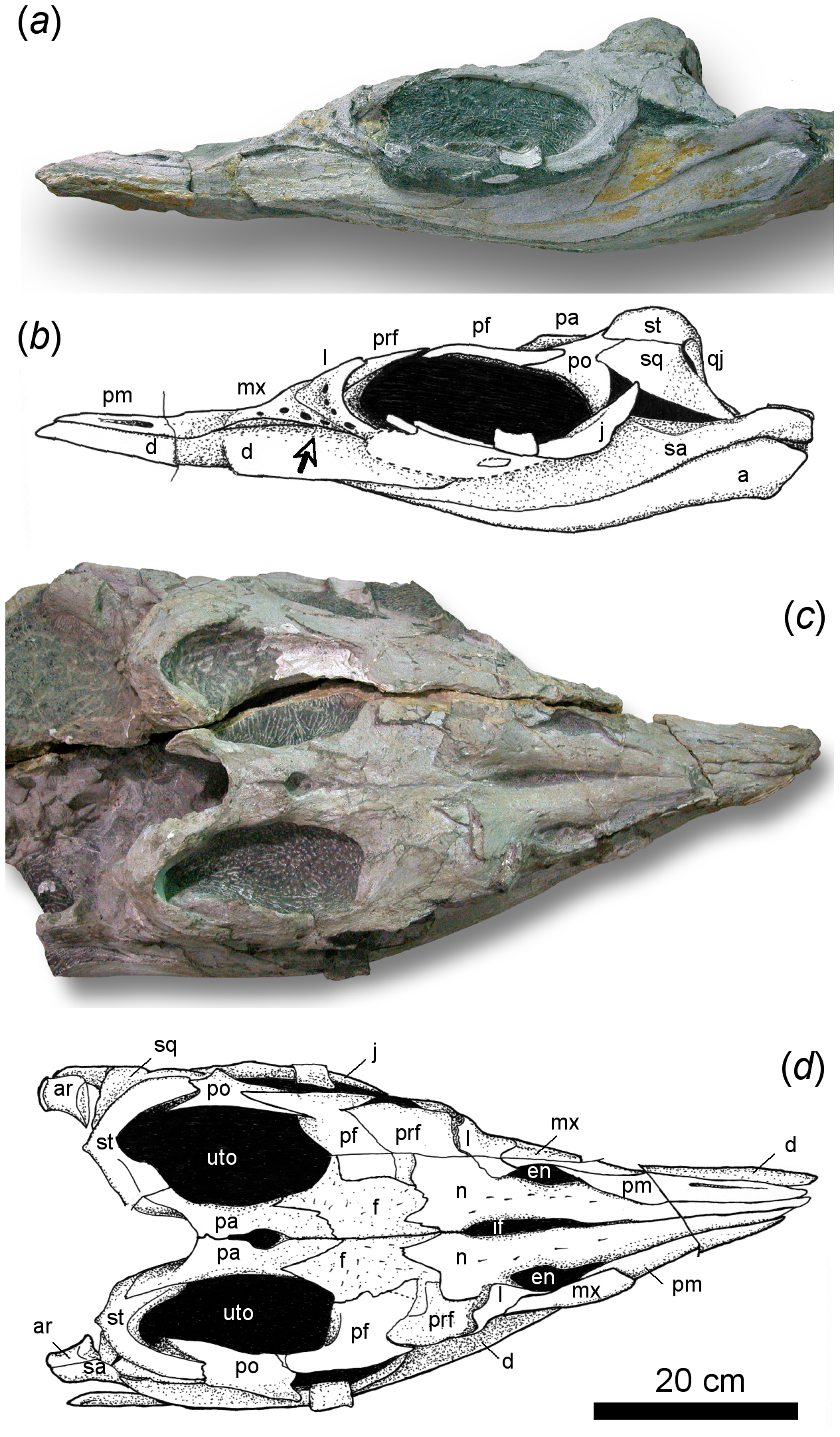
Skull of specimen YGMIR SPCV03107

The largest specimen of Guanlingsaurus, YIGMR SPCV03109, measures 8.3 metres (27 ft) long, while the juvenile specimen YIGMR SPCV03108 measures 3.74 metres (12.3 ft) in length. In the largest specimen, YIGMR SPCV03109, the skull takes up 8.3% of the total body length, whereas it forms 9.3% in the juvenile specimen YIGMR SPCV03108. Both adult and juvenile specimens of Guanlingsaurus completely lack teeth and do not even possess a dental groove. The very short snout was highly compressed via a unique arrangement of skull bones. All bones of the snout tapered to abrupt points. In 2011, Sander and colleagues interpreted the nasal bones (paired skull roof bones in the middle part of the skull) as extending to the very tip of the snout, a very unusual configuration for a reptile. However, Ji and colleagues did not find this feature, and found the hyoid bone much shorter than previous estimation, indicating that it was not suitable for suction feeding.

== Classification ==
Below is a cladogram from Fröbisch et al. (2013) showing Guanlingsaurus liangae as a species of Shastasaurus:

- Ichthyopterygia
  - Parvinatator
  - - Utatsusaurus
    - - - Grippia
        - Chaohusaurus
      - Ichthyosauria
        - - Mixosaurus cornalianus
          - - Phalarodon atavus
            - Phalarodon fraasi
        - - "Cymbospondylus" buchseri
          - - Cymbospondylus piscosus
            - - - Californosaurus
                - Toretocnemus
              - - Besanosaurus
                - - Thalattoarchon saurophagis
                  - - - Shonisaurus popularis
                      - - Shastasaurus sikanniensis
                        - - Shastasaurus pacificus
                          - Shastasaurus liangae
                    - - Guizhouichthyosaurus
                      - - Callawayia
                        - - Hudsonelpidia
                          - - Suevoleviathan
                              (continued...)
