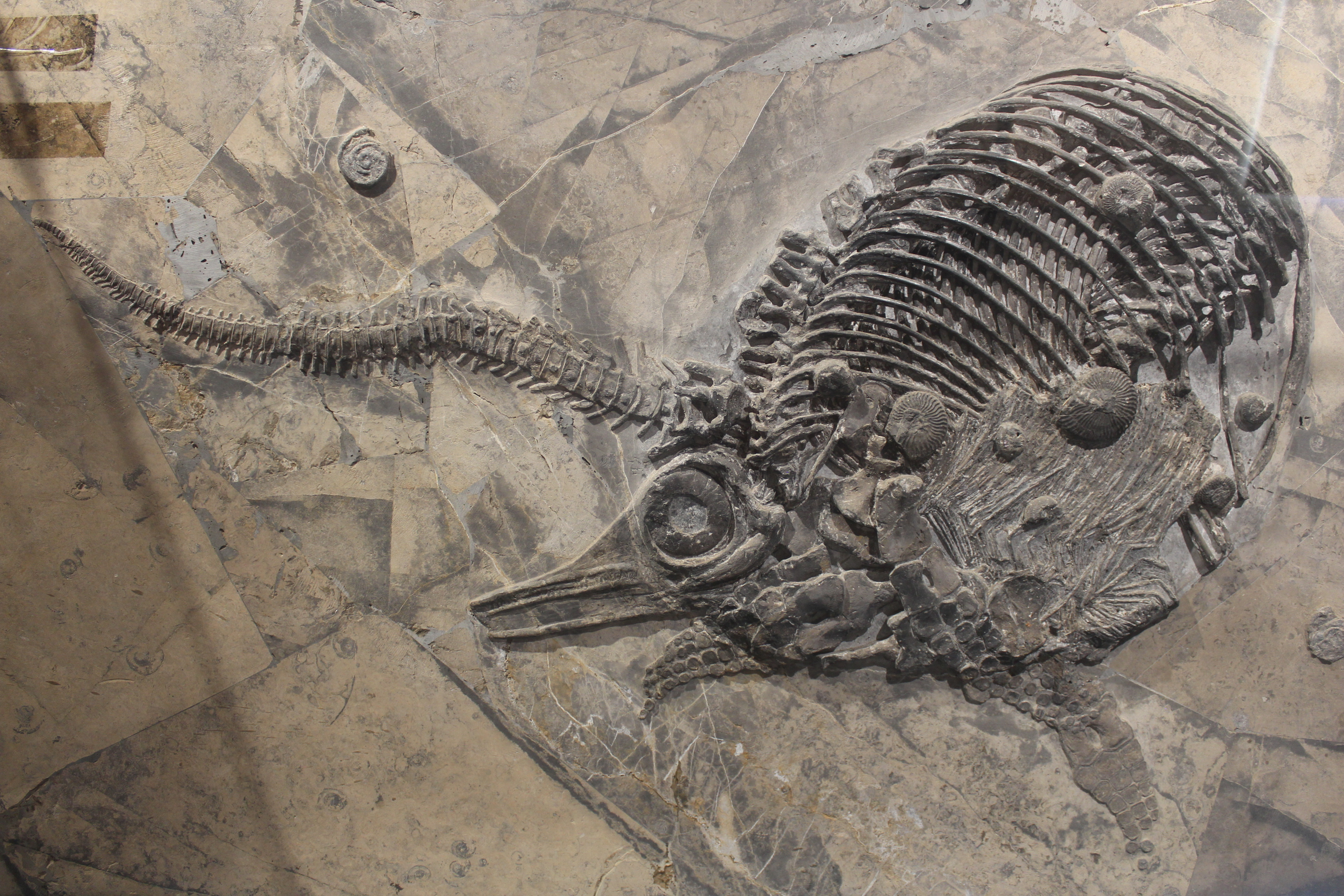
- Fossil specimen of Q. zhoui, Geological Museum of China

Scientific classification
- Domain: Eukaryota
- Kingdom: Animalia
- Phylum: Chordata
- Class: Reptilia
- Order: †Ichthyosauria
- Family: †Toretocnemidae
- Genus: †Qianichthyosaurus; Li, 1999

Type species
- Qianichthyosaurus zhoui Li, 1999

Other species
- Q. xingyiensis Yang et al., 2013

= Qianichthyosaurus =

Qianichthyosaurus Temporal range: Ladinian-Carnian

Extinct genus of reptiles

Qianichthyosaurus is an extinct genus of ichthyosaur from the Ladinian and Carnian stages of the Late Triassic epoch. Its fossils have been found in southeastern China, in Carnian rocks of the Falang Formation near Huangtutang, Guizhou. The type species is Qianichthyosaurus zhoui, named by Chun Li in 1999. A second species, Qianichthyosaurus xingyiensis, was named from older (Ladinian) deposits in the Falang Formation in 2013 by Pengfei Yang and colleagues. Complete Qianichthyosaurus fossils are common in the Xiaowa Formation, with both juveniles and pregnant specimens being known; its larger contemporaries, Guizhouichthyosaurus and Guanlingsaurus, are rarer.

Qianichthyosaurus was a small ichthyosaur, with the type species Q. zhoui measuring 1.5–2 m (4.9–6.6 ft) long; Q. xingyiensis was smaller, measuring 1.3 m (4.3 ft) long. Both species had short, pointed snouts, small teeth, and hind flippers that were nearly as long as the front flippers. Between the two species, Q. xingyiensis had a longer snout. Qianichthyosaurus is most similar to Toretocnemus from the Carnian of California, United States. They share the expanded bottom end of their femora and their four-digited flippers with notches on both edges, but Qianichthyosaurus has longer front flippers and differently-shaped ischia. The two genera together form the family Toretocnemidae.

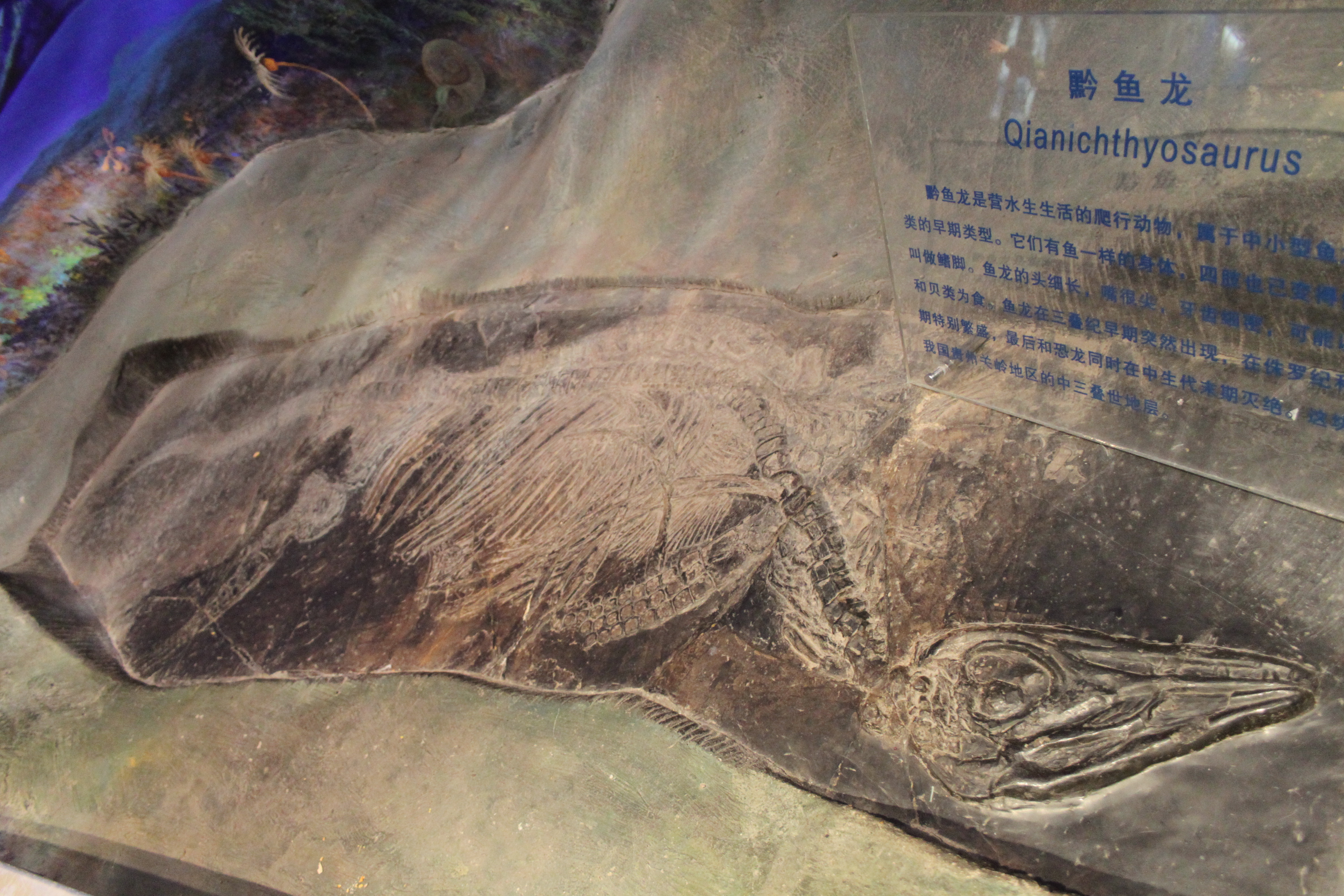
Fossil specimen of Q. zhoui, Beijing Natural History Museum

== See also ==
- List of ichthyosaurs
- Timeline of ichthyosaur research
