= Quasianosteosaurus =

Quasianosteosaurus Temporal range: Early Triassic, 249–247.2 Ma

Scientific classification
- Domain: Eukaryota
- Kingdom: Animalia
- Phylum: Chordata
- Class: Reptilia
- Order: †Ichthyosauria
- Family: †Quasianosteosauridae; Maisch & Matzke, 2003
- Genus: †Quasianosteosaurus; Maisch & Matzke, 2003

Type species
- †Quasianosteosaurus vikinghoegdai Maisch & Matzke, 2003

Extinct genus of reptiles

Quasianosteosaurus is an extinct genus of basal ichthyosaur known from the late Early Triassic (late Olenekian stage) of Spitsbergen of the Svalbard archipelago, Norway. It was first named by Michael Werner Maisch and Andreas Theodor Matzke in 2003 and the type species is Quasianosteosaurus vikinghoegdai. The generic name is derived from Latin quasi, "almost", and Greek anosteos, "boneless" and sauros, "lizard", regarding the preservation of the holotype which is almost exclusively a natural cast of the skull with very little original bone. The specific name is derived from Vikinghøgda, "Mount Viking", where the holotype was found. Quasianosteosaurus is known only from the holotype MNHN Nr. SVT 331, a partial three-dimensionally preserved skull consisting of the snout and orbital and postorbital regions. The skull is by far the largest Early Triassic ichthyosaur skull known, with an estimated cranial length of 50 cm (20 in). It was collected from the lowermost Grippia Niveau of the Sticky Keep Formation (Spathian substage), Sassendalen Group at Mount Viking, Sassendalen. A phylogenetic analysis performed by Maisch & Matzke (2003) found it to be a basal ichthyosaur, sister taxon to Hueneosauria.
