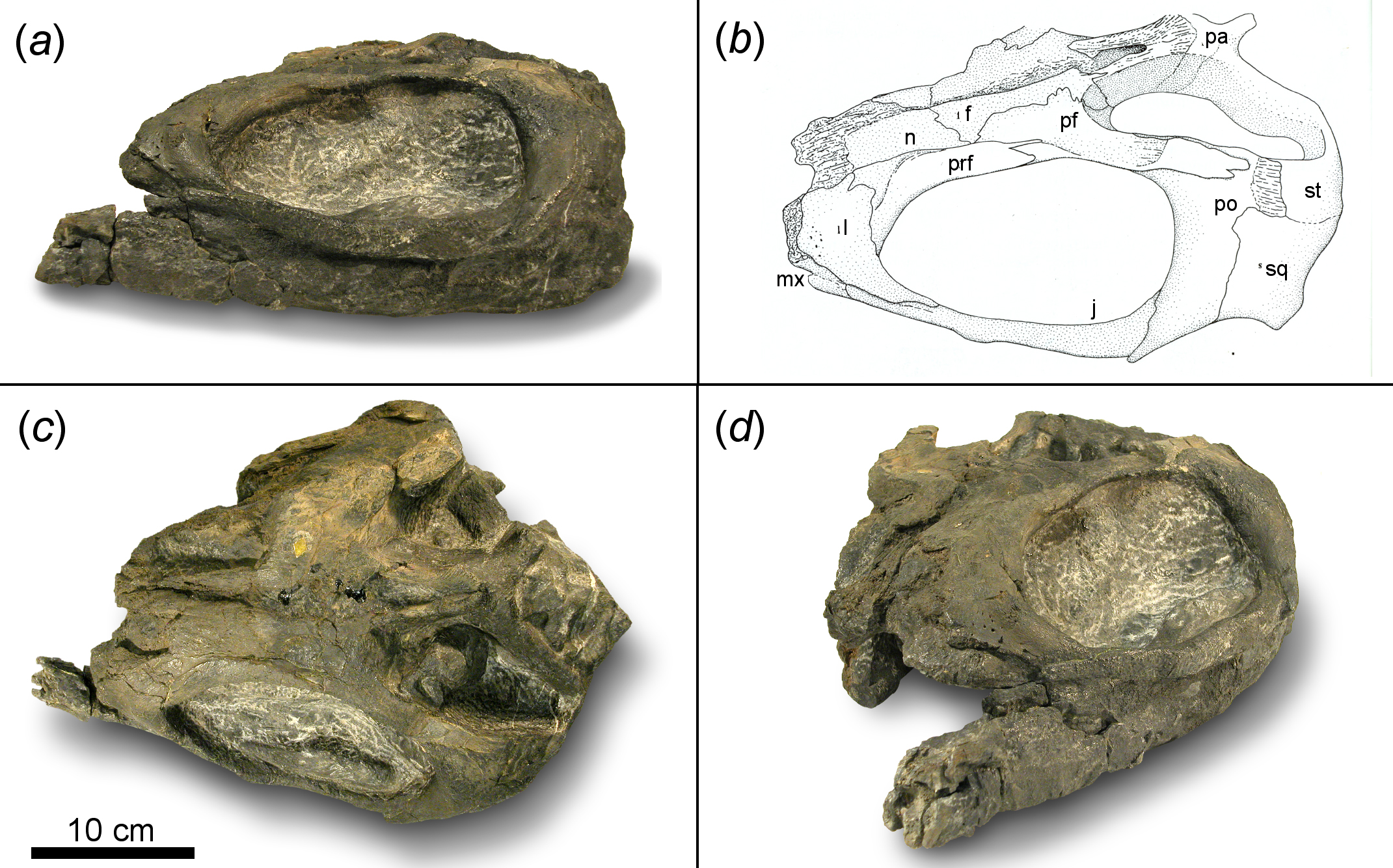
- A partial skull of Shastasaurus pacificus, a species which defines the clade Merriamosauria

Scientific classification
- Domain: Eukaryota
- Kingdom: Animalia
- Phylum: Chordata
- Class: Reptilia
- Order: †Ichthyosauria
- Suborder: †Longipinnati
- Node: †Merriamosauria; Motani, 1999

Subgroups
- †Besanosaurus; †Pessopteryx; †Pessosaurus; †Thalattoarchon; †Shastasauridae; †Euichthyosauria; †Californosaurus; †Callawayia; †Guizhouichthyosaurus; †Parvipelvia

= Merriamosauria =

Merriamosauria Temporal range: Middle Triassic - Late Cretaceous

Extinct clade of reptiles

Merriamosauria is an extinct clade of ichthyosaurs. It was named by Ryosuke Motani in his 1999 analysis of the relationships of ichthyopterygian marine reptiles and was defined in phylogenetic terms as a stem-based taxon including "the last common ancestor of Shastasaurus pacificus and Ichthyosaurus communis, and all of its descendants." The name honours John Campbell Merriam. Based on this definition, Merriamosauria includes most ichthyosaurs except for several Triassic groups such as the clade Mixosauria, the family Cymbospondylidae, and perhaps the family Toretocnemidae. Merriamosaurs are characterized by features in their pectoral girdles and limb bones, including an extensive connection between the scapula and the coracoid bone, the absence of the first metacarpal and the absence of a pisiform bone.

In addition to Shastasaurus, this clade includes Shonisaurus, Guizhouichthyosaurus, an unnamed Norian taxon from Alaska, and many other genera.
