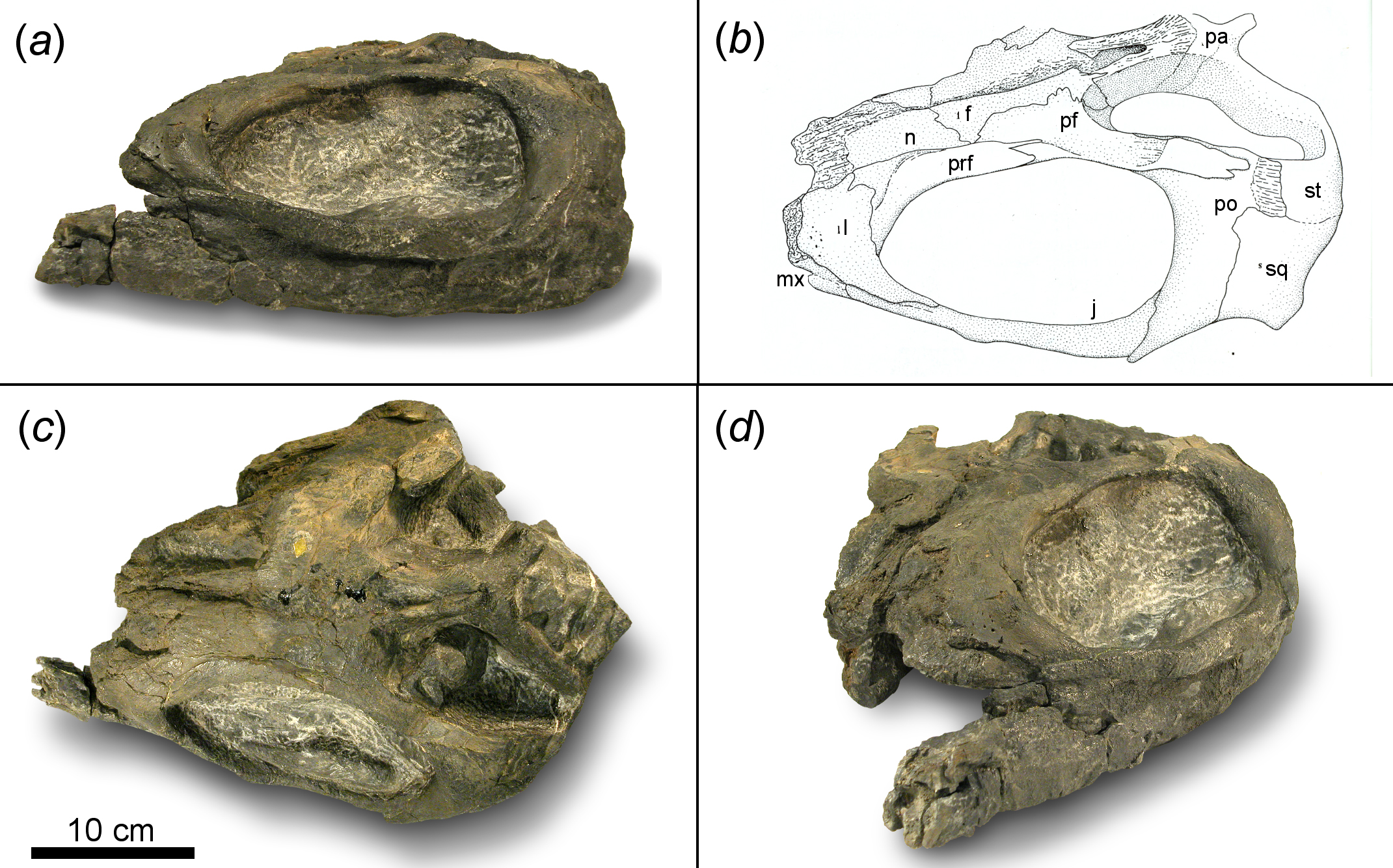
- Partial skull of Shastasaurus pacificus (UCMP 9017)

Scientific classification
- Kingdom: Animalia
- Phylum: Chordata
- Class: Reptilia
- Order: †Ichthyosauria
- Suborder: †Longipinnati
- Node: †Merriamosauria
- Family: †Shastasauridae; Merriam, 1895
- Genus: †Shastasaurus; Merriam, 1895

Type species
- †Shastasaurus pacificus Merriam, 1895

Species
- †S. pacificus Merriam, 1895 †S.? liangae (Yin et al., 2000 [originally Guanlingsaurus]) †S.? sikanniensis (Nicholls & Manabe, 2004 [originally Shonisaurus])

Synonyms
- ?Guanlingsaurus Yin et al., 2000

= Shastasaurus =

Shastasaurus Temporal range: Late Triassic, 235.0–205.6 Ma

Extinct genus of ichthyosaur reptile

Shastasaurus ("Mount Shasta lizard") is an extinct genus of ichthyosaur from the Late Triassic. Specimens have been found in the United States, Canada, and China.

== Description ==
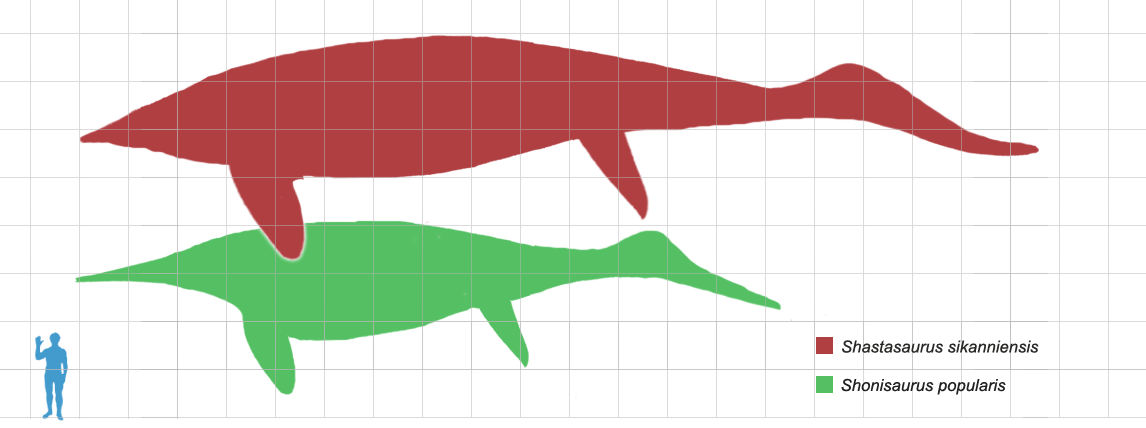
Size of Shonisaurus popularis (green) and S. sikanniensis (red), a possible species of Shastasaurus, compared with a human

Shastasaurus lived during the late Triassic period. The type species, S. pacificus, is known from California, with the name Shastasaurus directly referencing Shasta County, Northern California, where the type specimen was found. S. pacificus was a medium-sized ichthyosaur, measuring over 7 metres (23 ft) in length. A second possible species of Shastasaurus, S. sikanniensis, is known from the Pardonet Formation British Columbia, dating to the middle Norian age (about 210 million years ago). By comparison, S. sikanniensis was one of the largest known ichthyosaurs, similar in size to modern-day cetaceans, measuring up to 21 metres (69 ft) in length and weighing 81.5 metric tons (89.8 short tons).

Shastasaurus was highly specialized, and differed considerably from other ichthyosaurs. It was very slender in profile. S. sikanniensis had a ribcage slightly less than 2 metres (6.6 ft) deep despite a distance of over 7 metres (23 ft) between its flippers. With its unusually short, toothless snout (compared to the longer, toothed, dolphin-like snouts of most ichthyosaurs), it had been proposed that Shastasaurus was a suction feeder (or filled a similar ecological niche as extant beaked whales), preying primarily on soft-bodied cephalopods. However, current research indicates that the jaws of shastasaurid ichthyosaurs do not fit the suction-feeding profile, since their short and narrow hyoid bones are unsuitable to withstand impact forces for such kind of feeding, and since some species like Shonisaurus had robust sectorial teeth with gut contents of mollusk shells and vertebrates.

It is unknown whether Shastasaurus had a dorsal fin; however, the smaller, more basal ichthyosaur Mixosaurus had one. The upper fluke of the tail was probably much less-developed than the shark-like tails found in later species.

== Species and synonyms ==
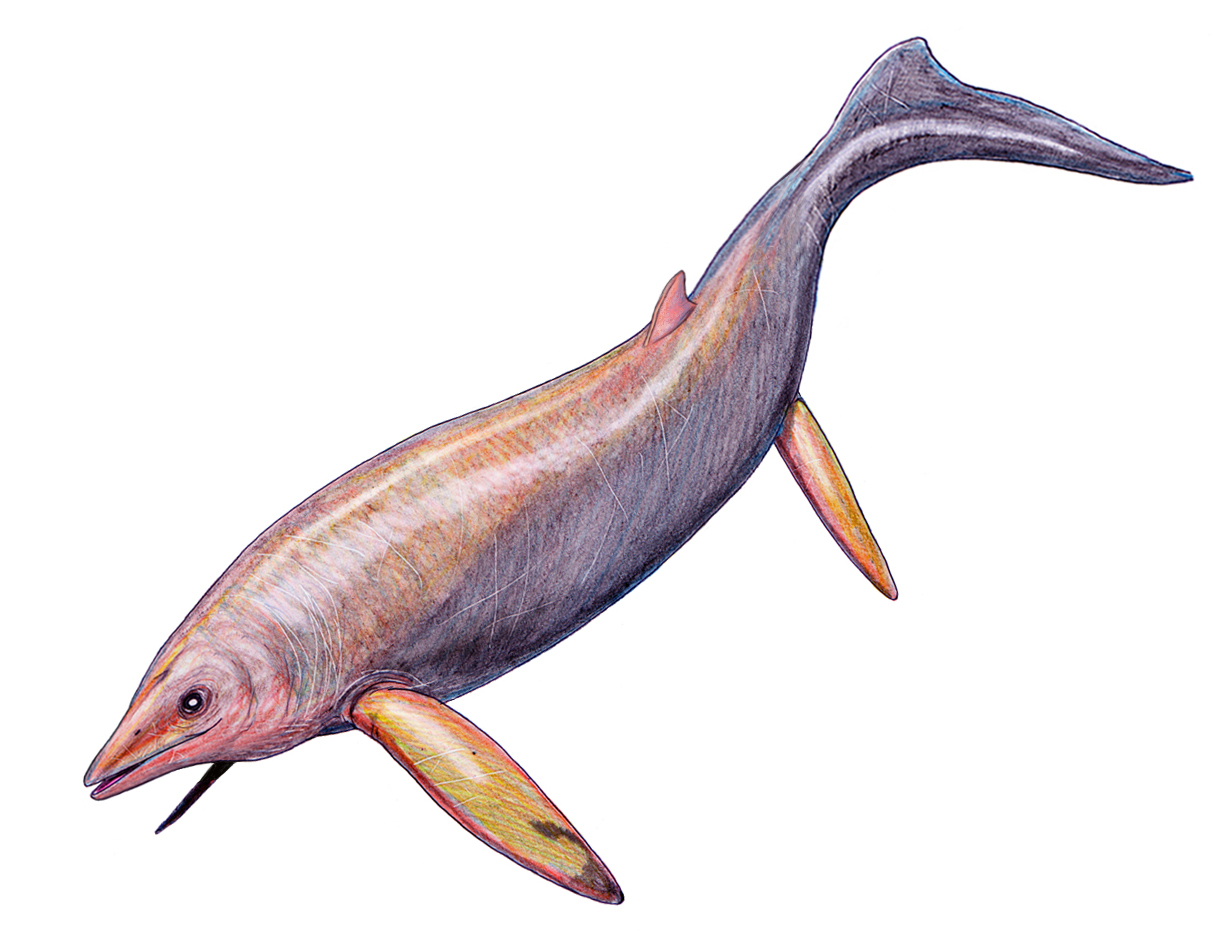
Restoration of S. pacificus

The type species of Shastasaurus is S. pacificus, from the late Carnian of northern California. It is known only from fragmentary remains, which have led to the assumption that it was a 'normal' ichthyosaur in terms of proportions, especially skull proportions. Several species of long-snouted ichthyosaur were referred to Shastasaurus based on this misinterpretation, but are now placed in other genera (including Callawayia and Guizhouichthyosaurus). Elizabeth Nicholls and Makoto Manabe considered this species as a nomen dubium in 2000.

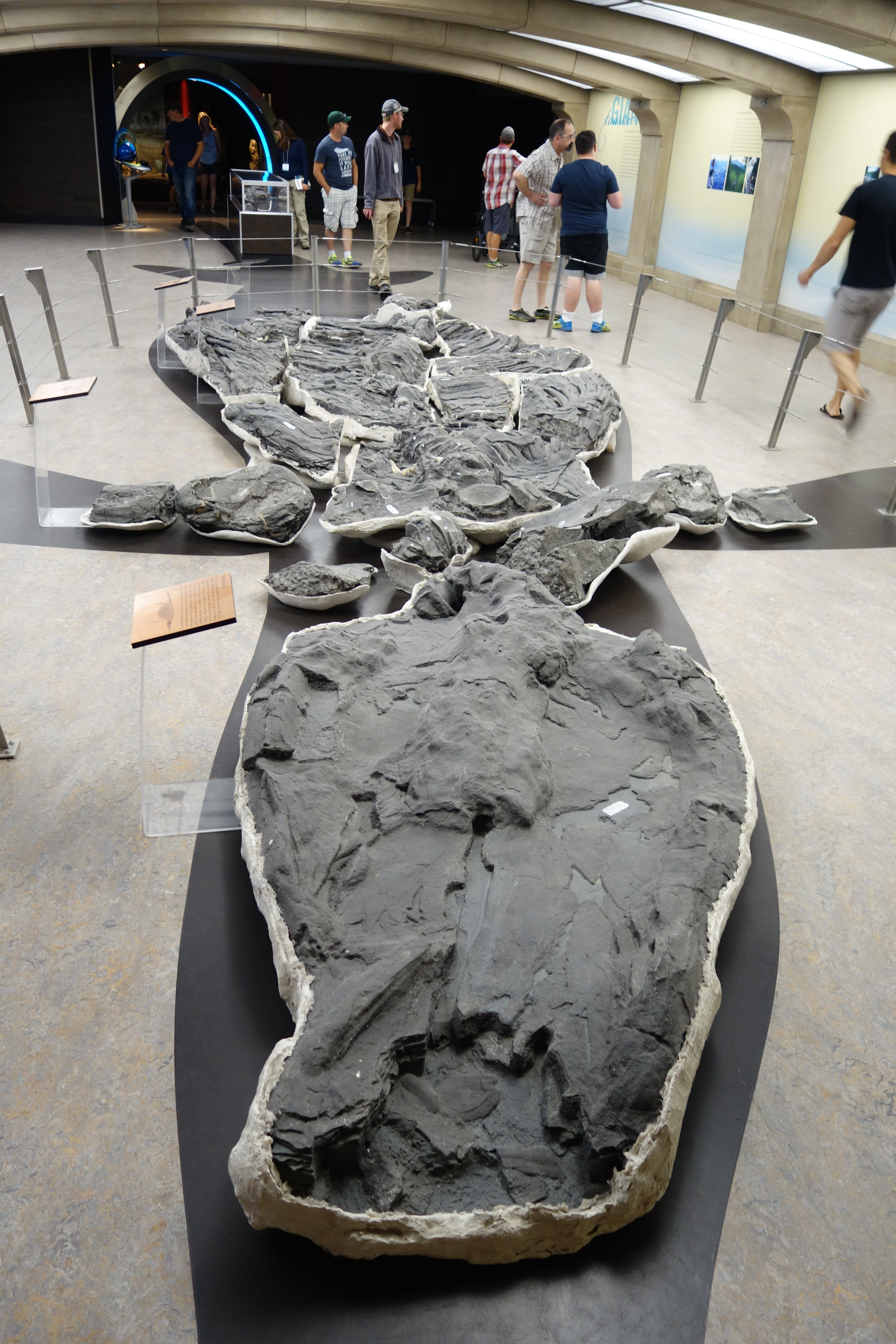
S. sikanniensis specimen, Royal Tyrrell Museum

Shastasaurus may include a second species, Shastasaurus liangae. It is known from several good specimens, and was originally placed in the separate genus Guanlingsaurus. Complete skulls show that it had an unusual short and toothless snout. S. pacificus probably also had a short snout, although its skull is incompletely known. However, a new juvenile specimen discovered in 2013 shows that the hyoid bone of Guanlingsaurus is much shorter, and considered it as a distinct genus based on phylogenetic analysis.

S. sikanniensis was originally described in 2004 as a large species of Shonisaurus. However, this classification was not based on any phylogenetic analysis, and the authors also noted similarities with Shastasaurus. The first study testing its relationships, in 2011, supported the hypothesis that it was indeed more closely related to Shastasaurus than to Shonisaurus, and it was reclassified as Shastasaurus sikanniensis. However, a 2013 analysis supported the original classification, finding it more closely related to Shonisaurus than to Shastasaurus. In the 2019 study, S. sikanniensis was pertained within the genus Shastasaurus. In the 2021 analysis, S. sikanniensis forms a clade with Shonisaurus, indicating that it is closer to Shonisaurus than to Shastasaurus. Specimens belonging to S. sikanniensis have been found in the Pardonet Formation British Columbia, dating to the middle Norian age.

In 2009, Shang & Li reclassified the species Guizhouichthyosaurus tangae as Shastasaurus tangae. However, later analysis showed that Guizhouichthyosaurus was in fact closer to more advanced ichthyosaurs, and so cannot be considered a species of Shastasaurus.

Dubious species that were referred to this genus include S. carinthiacus (Huene, 1925) from the Austrian Alps and S. neubigi (Sander, 1997) from the German Muschelkalk. S. neubigi, however, was re-described and reassigned to its own genus, Phantomosaurus.

Synonyms of S. / G. liangae:
Guanlingichthyosaurus liangae Wang et al., 2008 (lapsus calami)

Synonyms of S. pacificus:
Shastasaurus alexandrae Merriam, 1902
Shastasaurus osmonti Merriam, 1902

== See also ==
- List of ichthyosaurs
- Timeline of ichthyosaur research
- Shonisaurus
