= Xinminosaurus =

Xinminosaurus Temporal range: Middle Triassic, 245–235 Ma

Scientific classification
- Kingdom: Animalia
- Phylum: Chordata
- Class: Reptilia
- Order: †Ichthyosauria
- Family: †Cymbospondylidae
- Genus: †Xinminosaurus; Jiang et al., 2008

Type species
- †Xinminosaurus catactes Jiang et al., 2008

Extinct genus of reptiles

Xinminosaurus is an extinct genus of cymbospondylid ichthyosaur known from the Middle Triassic (mid-late Anisian stage) of Guizhou Province, China.

== Etymology ==
The generic name is derived from Xinmin, the district where the fossil was found, and Greek sauros, "lizard". The specific name is derived from Greek kataktes, "crusher", in reference to one of the taxon's autapomorphies - the presence of bulbous and laterally compressed crushing teeth in maxilla and posterior dentary.

== Discovery ==
Xinminosaurus is known only from the holotype GMPKU-P-1071, a nearly complete skeleton deposited in Geological Museum, Peking University. It was collected from the conodont Nicoraella kockeli biozone (Pelsonian of the Anisian stage), from the upper member of the Guanling Formation. It was found near Yangjuan Village of the Xinmin District, Panxian County. Maisch suggested that Xinminosaurus might be a subjective junior synonym of Tholodus. Although Jiang et al. regarded Tholodus to be a possible nomen dubium, Maisch rejected this opinion, stating that Tholodus is easily recognized and characterized by unequivocal dental autapomorphies, so that even jaw and tooth fragments are diagnostic, and it is thus a valid taxon. Furthermore, he noted that Tholodus is clearly distinguishable from all other known marine reptiles, except Xinminosaurus. The only difference between the taxa, according to Maisch, is that Tholodus specimens are on average twice as large as the holotype of Xinminosaurus.

Mulder and Jagt (2019) demonstrated that the tooth crowns of the putative mosasaur "Globidens" timorensis from West Timor reveal a striking resemblance to those of the Triassic durophagous ichthyosaur genera Tholodus and Xinminosaurus. There they tentatively reassign them to the latter genus as Xinminosaurus(?) timorensis, because provenance of the Chinese taxon is geographically closer to the Timor.

== Description ==
The holotype specimen of Xinminosaurus has a total length of 2.32 metres (7.6 ft), while its skull measures 29 centimeters long. The skull is poorly preserved, which obscures much of its anatomy. The teeth of Xinminosaurus lack constrictions. In the maxillae (back upper tooth-bearing bones) and back parts of the dentaries (lower tooth-bearing bones) they are bulbous but narrow from side to side. The replacement teeth of these bones were not located in the pulp cavities, instead being present as a second row of teeth. The very tips of its jaws, however, may have been toothless, while the teeth at the front of the denataries are cone-shaped.

=== Postcranial skeleton ===
Xinminosaurus has a total of 140 vertebrae. Of these, about 60 are located in front of the hips, a very high number, similar to some other ichthyosaurs. These vertebrae are followed by 3 sacral (hip) vertebrae and 77 caudal (tail) vertebrae. As in other ichthyopterygians, there is a prominent bend in the middle of the tail, where the neural spines slope forwards. In Xinminosaurus, the tail is bent downwards at a 35° angle, starting at caudal vertebra 38.

Each scapula (shoulder blade) is composed of a broad, fan-like blade and a process that forms the shoulder joint, separated by a shaft. The latter of these structures has an outwards-bowed lower end with a notch and extends further forwards than backwards. The coracoids (a pair of shoulder bones) are greater in width than length. Xinminosaurus has short, wide collarbones. The interclavicle (a shoulder bone between the collarbones) does not have a backwards projection.

The long limb bones of Xinminosaurus are atypical for an ichthyosaur. The humeri (upper arm bones) of Xinminosaurus bear bladelike projections on their front edges, and Ichthyopterygian characteristic. The middle part of the humeri is not narrower than the ends of the bones. The lower ends of the ulnae (rear lower arm bones) are very large, curving upwards and extending more than halfway up along the shafts. Xinminosaurus has three upper wrist bones, which are rectangular in shape. The ulnares (bones below the ulnae) are the largest of these. Distinctive traits in the wrist of this genus include the coalescence of two of the lower wrist bones, distal carpals 3 and 4, and the absence of a bony distal carpal 1. The other distal carpal, distal carpal 2, is roughly elliptical in shape. While narrower, the metacarpals of Xinminosaurus resemble those of the non-ichthyosaurian ichthyopterygian Utatsusaurus, with the first being the shortest and the third and fourth being the longest. The first four are shaped like hourglasses while the fifth is shaped like a kidney. The number of bones in each digit in the foreflipper is 3, 5, 5, 5, and 2 respectively, small counts for an ichthyosaur. The phalanges (digit bones) are long and at least the upper ones are hourglass-shaped.

The upper and lower hindlimb bones are shorter than those of the forelimb. The upper ends of the tibiae (front lower hindlimb bones) are nearly twice as wide as their lower ends. There are two upper ankle bones in Xinminosaurus, the rear one (calcaneum) larger than the front one (astragalus) and both being vaguely round. The lower ankle bones resemble the lower wrist bones, with an absent distal tarsal 1 and combined distal tarsals 3 and 4. The metatarsals and phalanges are similar to the metacarpals and the phalanges in the foreflippers, although the exact number of phalanges in each digit in the hindflippers is unknown.
