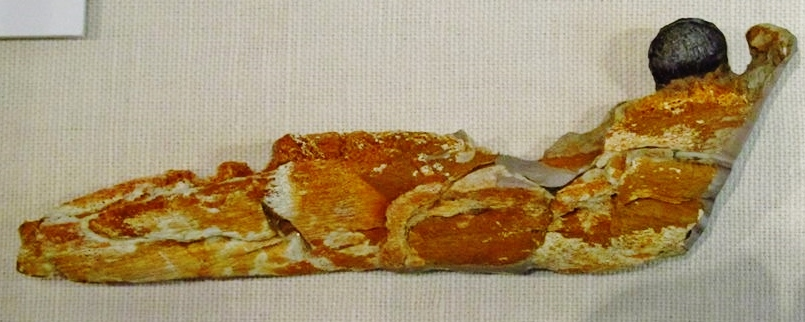
- Jaw

Scientific classification
- Domain: Eukaryota
- Kingdom: Animalia
- Phylum: Chordata
- Class: Reptilia
- Order: †Ichthyosauria
- Genus: †Tholodus von Meyer, 1851

Type species
- †Tholodus schmidi von Meyer, 1851

Synonyms
- ?Xinminosaurus catactes (Jiang et al., 2008)

= Tholodus =

Tholodus Temporal range: Middle Triassic, 245–235 Ma

Extinct genus of reptiles

Tholodus is an extinct genus of basal ichthyopterygian known from the Middle Triassic (mid-late Anisian to late Ladinian stage) of Germany, northeastern Italy and possibly China. It was first named by Christian Erich Hermann von Meyer in 1851 and the type species is Tholodus schmidi. It is known from many disarticulated and fragmentary remains, mainly teeth and jaw fragments. Most specimens were collected from various localities across the Ladinian-aged Muschelkalk, Germany, mainly from the Jena Formation of the upper Lower Muschelkalk, where the holotype was found. Dalla Vecchia (2004) recently described two additional specimens, a mandibular ramus and a maxilla, both bearing teeth and nearly uncrushed, and some postcranial remains, from a single late Anisian outcrop, from the southern Alps of Italy. The humerus resembled that of immature individuals of the Asian genus Chaohusaurus, suggesting possible affinities to Grippidia.

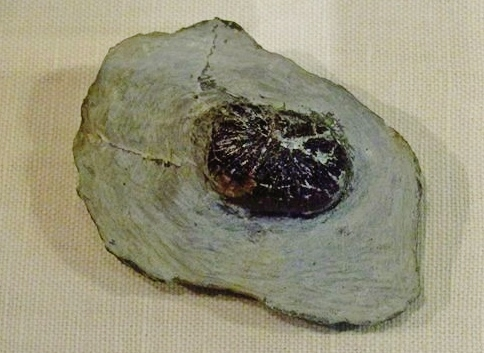
Tooth

Jiang et al. (2008) described and named Xinminosaurus from the mid-late Anisian Guanling Formation of Guizhou, China. Maisch (2010) suggested that Xinminosaurus might be a subjective junior synonym of Tholodus. Although Jiang et al. (2008) regarded Tholodus to be a possible nomen dubium, Maisch (2010) rejected this opinion, stating that Tholodus is easily recognized and characterized by unequivocal dental autapomorphies, so that even jaw and tooth fragments are diagnostic, and it is thus a valid taxon. Furthermore, he noted that Tholodus is clearly distinguishable from all other known marine reptiles except Xinminosaurus. The only difference between the taxa, according to Maisch (2010), is that Tholodus specimens are at average twice as large as Xinminosaurus holotype.
