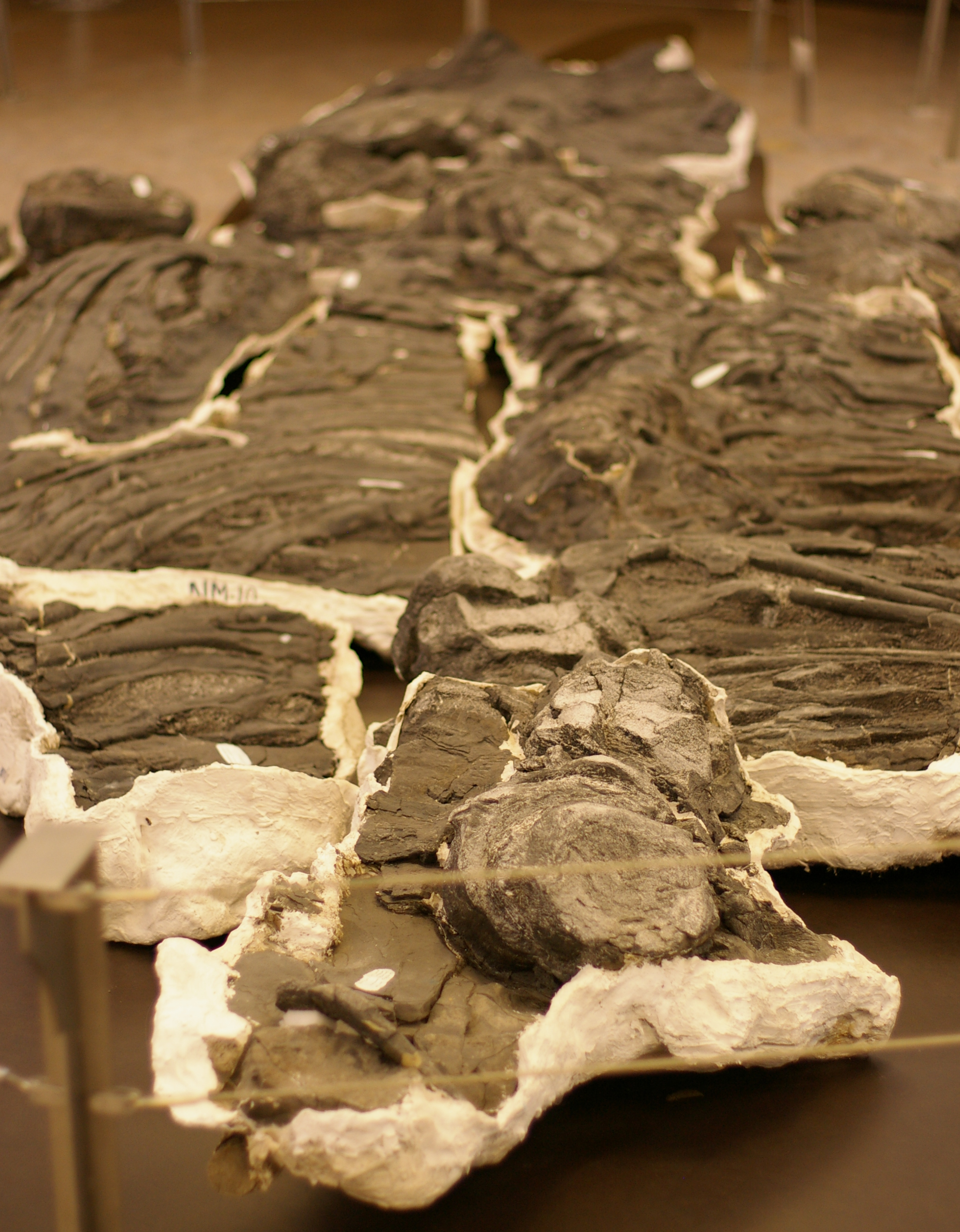
- Skeleton of Shastasaurus sikanniensis
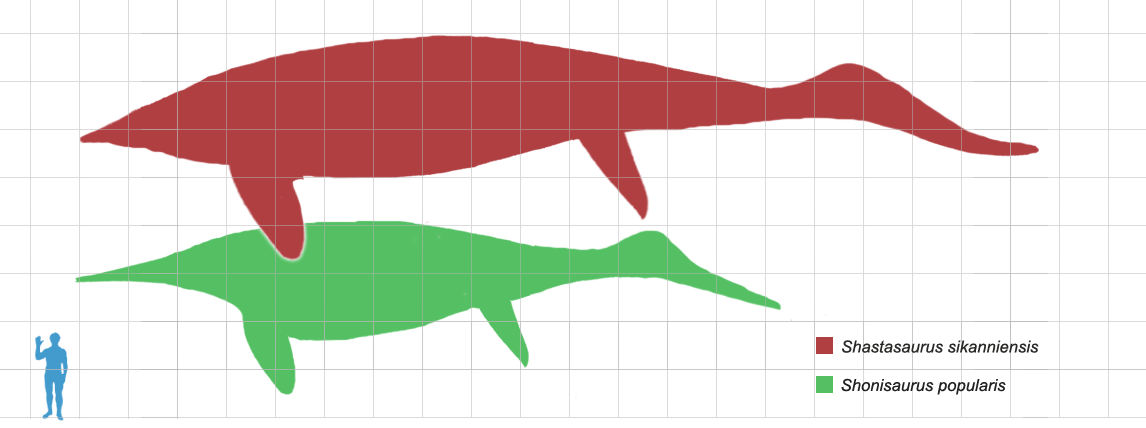
- Scale diagram of Shonisaurus

Scientific classification
- Kingdom: Animalia
- Phylum: Chordata
- Class: Reptilia
- Order: †Ichthyosauria
- Node: †Merriamosauria; Motani, 1999
- Family: †Shastasauridae; Merriam, 1895

Genera
- †Besanosaurus?; †Guanlingsaurus; †Guizhouichthyosaurus?; †Himalayasaurus; †Ichthyotitan?; †Shastasaurus; †Shonisaurus

= Shastasauridae =

Shastasauridae Temporal range: Late Triassic Possible Early Jurassic records

Extinct family of reptiles

Shastasauridae is an extinct family of ichthyosaurs from the Late Triassic with a possible Early Jurassic record. The family contains the largest known species of ichthyosaurs, which include some of and possibly the largest known marine reptiles.

== Taxonomy ==
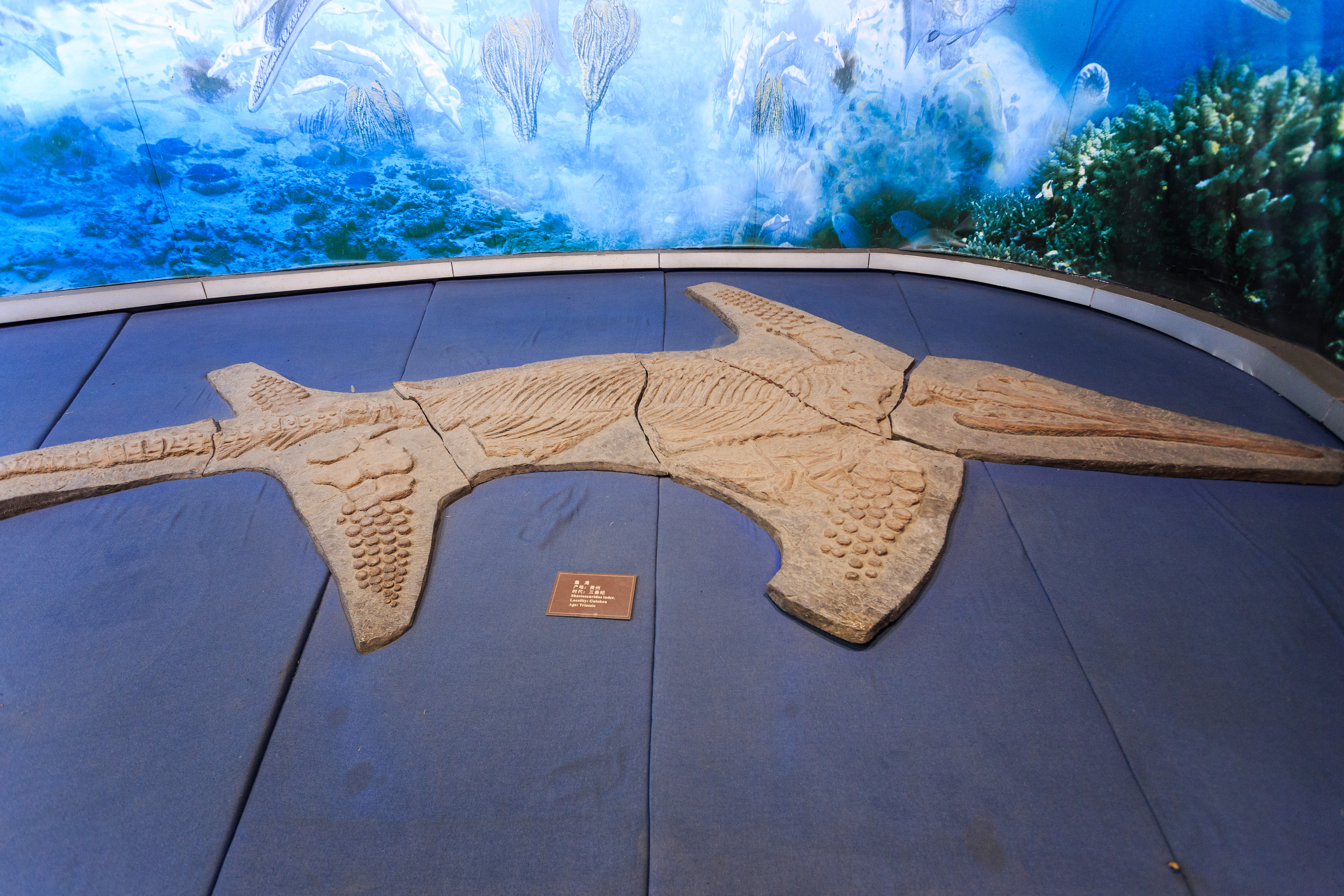
Shastasauridae indet. from China

Shastasauridae was named by American paleontologist John Campbell Merriam in 1895 along with the newly described genus Shastasaurus. In 1999, Ryosuke Motani erected the clade Shastasauria to include Shastasaurus, Shonisaurus, and several other traditional shastasaurids, defining it as a stem-based taxon including "all merriamosaurians more closely related to Shastasaurus pacificus than to Ichthyosaurus communis." He also redefined Shastasauridae as a node-based taxon including "the last common ancestor of Shastasaurus pacificus and Besanosaurus leptorhynchus, and all its descendants" and Shastasaurinae, which Merriam named in 1908, as a stem taxon including "the last common ancestor of Shastasaurus and Shonisaurus, and all its descendants." In an alternative classification scheme, paleontologist Michael Maisch restricted Shastasauridae to the genus Shastasaurus and placed Shonisaurus and Besanosaurus in separate families, Shonisauridae and Besanosauridae, respectively. In various studies, the grouping of Shastasauridae has been variously found to be either monophyletic or paraphyletic. Studies that have recovered the group as monophyletic generally include Shastasaurus, Besanosaurus, Guanlingsaurus, Guizhouichthyosaurus, Shonisaurus and 'Callawayia' wolonggangense within the group.

== Description ==
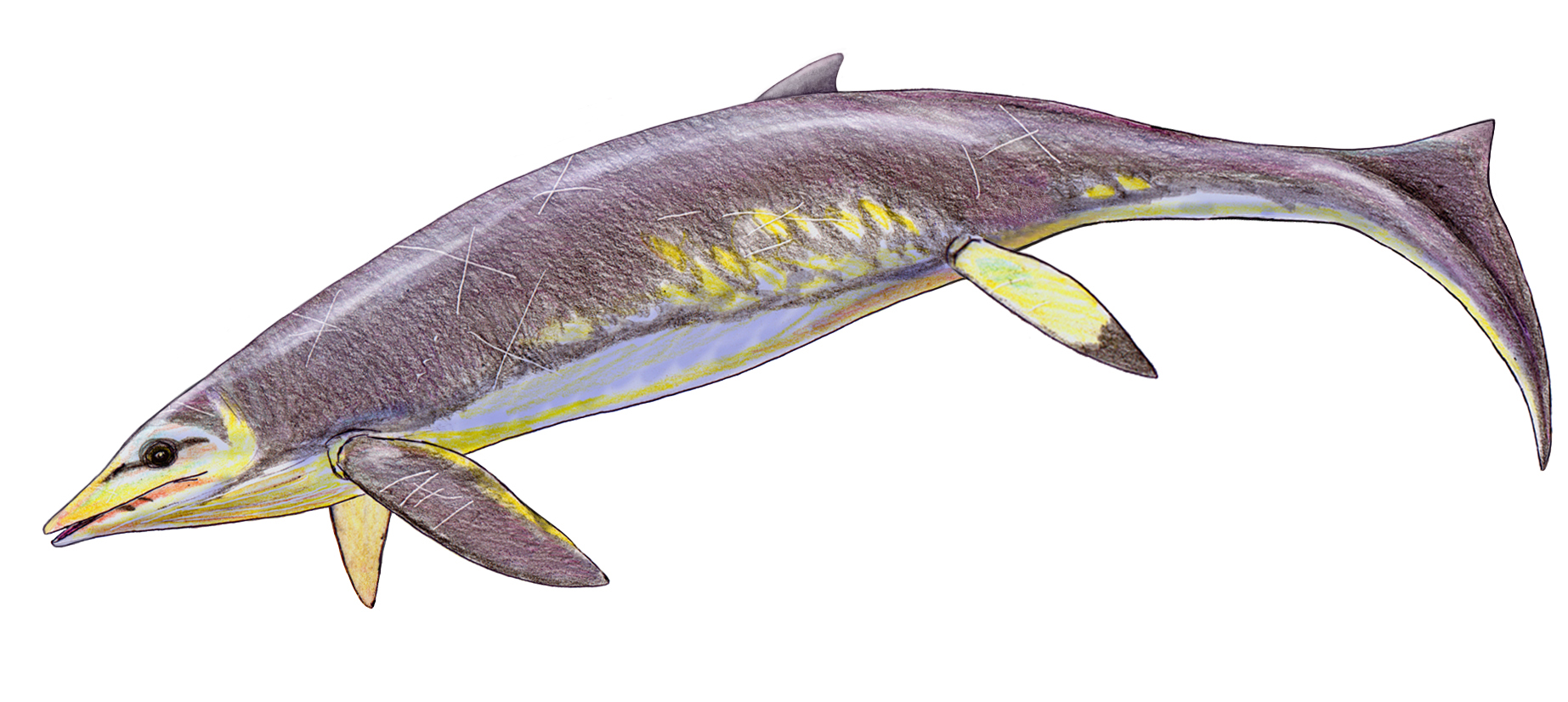
Life restoration of Guanlingsaurus

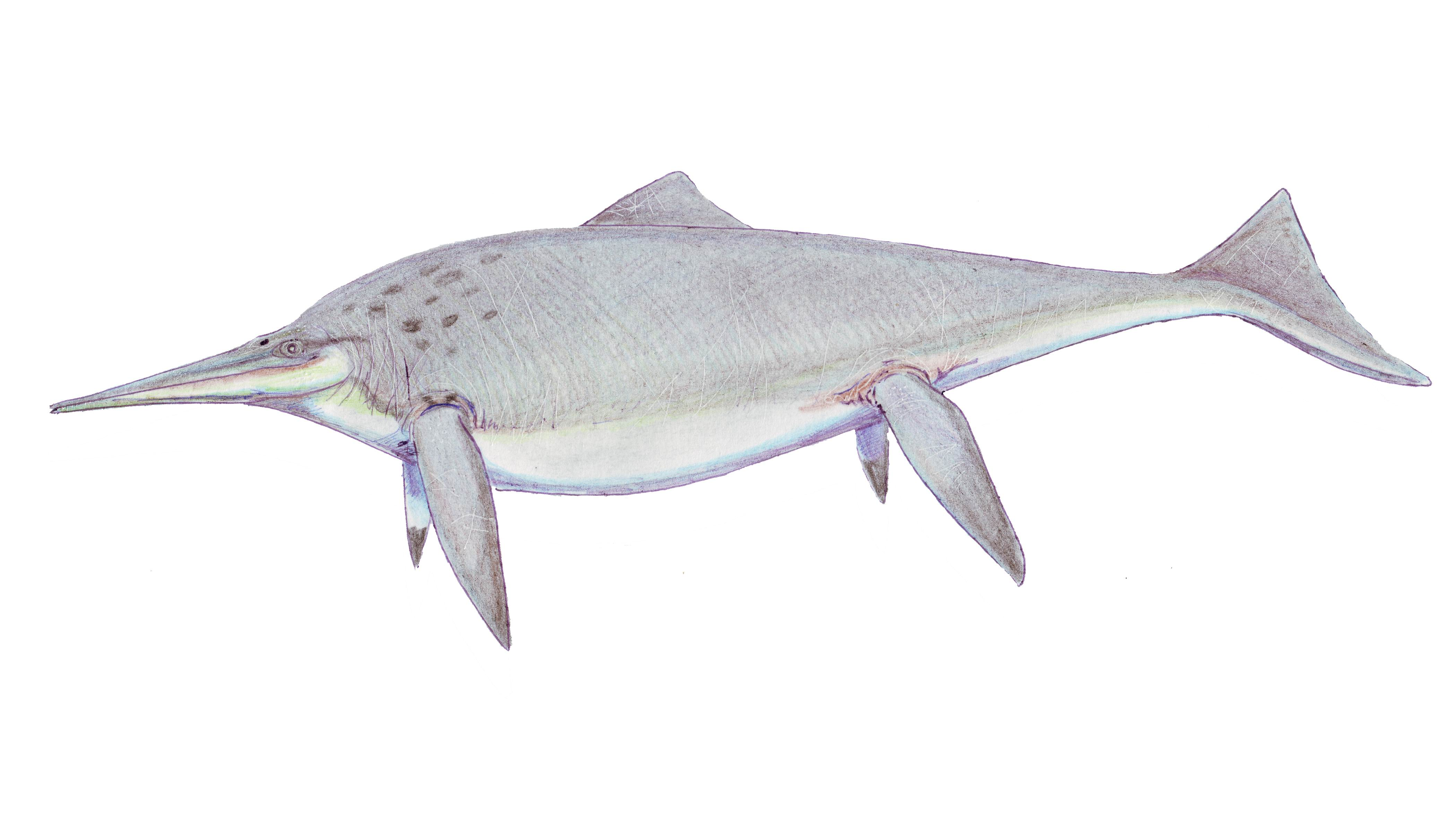
Shonisaurus popularis

Shastasaurids as typically defined have elongate bodies, with over 55 presacral vertebrae. They were the largest ichthyosaurs, with even some of the smaller species like Guanlingsaurus measuring over 8 metres (26 ft) in length. One of the largest specimens was discovered in England in May 2016, when researcher and fossil collector Paul de la Salle discovered a partial jawbone measuring 96 centimeters (3.15 ft) long which was catalogued as BRSMG Cg2488, also referred to as the Lilstock specimen. In 2018, Dean Lomax, de la Salle, Judy Massare, and Ramues Gallois identified the Lilstock specimen as a shastasaurid. While its incompleteness made the size of the animal difficult to suggest, it clearly was very large. Using Shonisaurus sikanniensis as a model, the researchers estimated the ichthyosaur to have been 26 meters (85 ft) long, nearly the size of a blue whale. Scaling based on Besanosaurus, however, found a shorter length estimate of 22 meters (72 ft). In 2024, the Lilstock specimen was referred to the newly described species Ichthyotitan, with a length estimate of up to 25 meters (82 ft).

== Feeding habits ==
Unlike other Triassic ichthyosaurs, which fed almost exclusively on cephalopods, shastasaurians fed on a variety of prey. Evidence for this prey diversity includes gut contents from Guizhouichthyosarus tangae, Shonisaurus popularis, and an unnamed specimen from the Brooks Range of Alaska.

Although older studies have suggested that shastasaurids were suction-feeders, current research indicates that the jaws of shastasaurid ichthyosaurs do not fit the suction-feeding profile, since their short and narrow hyoid bones are unsuitable to withstand impact forces for such kind of feeding, and since some species like Shonisaurus had robust sectorial teeth with gut contents of mollusk shells and vertebrates.
