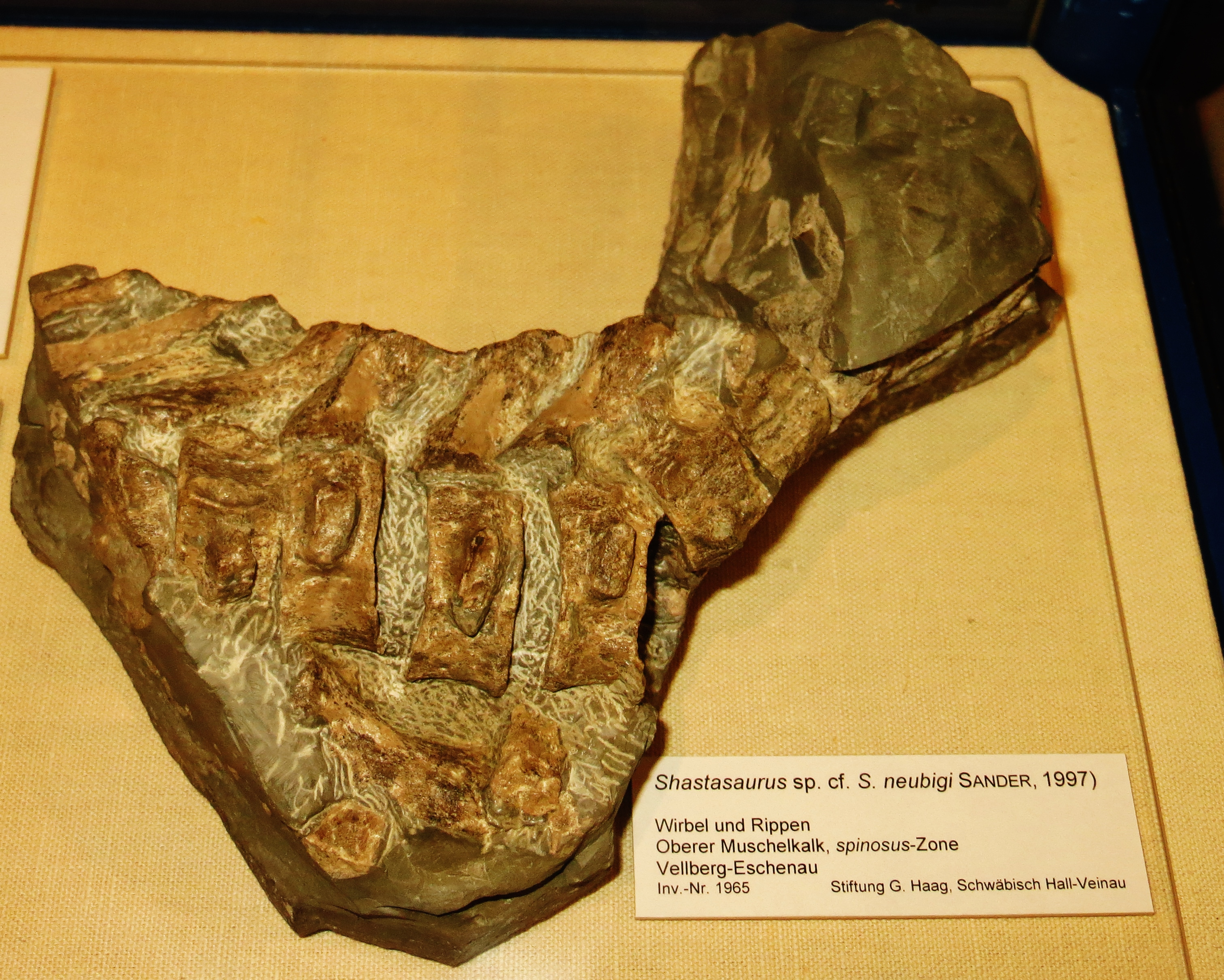
- Vertebrae and ribs

Scientific classification
- Kingdom: Animalia
- Phylum: Chordata
- Class: Reptilia
- Order: †Ichthyosauria
- Family: †Cymbospondylidae
- Genus: †Phantomosaurus; Maisch and Matzke, 2000
- Species: †P. neubigi

Binomial name
- †Phantomosaurus neubigi (Sander, 1997)

Synonyms
- Shastasaurus neubigi Sander, 1997

= Phantomosaurus =

Phantomosaurus Temporal range: Triassic, 247.2–242.0 Ma

Extinct genus of reptiles

Phantomosaurus is an extinct genus of ichthyosaur that lived during the late Anisian stage of the Middle Triassic. Fossils have been found in southern Germany. It was discovered in 1965 and named in 1997 as a species of Shastasaurus by Sander in the rocks of the Upper Muschelkalk.

More recently, in 2005, the braincase was studied by Maisch and Matzke. They found it to be unique among all known ichthyosaurs in terms of braincase morphology. Despite its close relation to many other ichthyosaurs, in particular Cymbospondylus, Phantomosaurus appears to have a very primitive braincase which resembles other diapsids more than other ichthyosaurs.

== Morphology ==
Phantomosaurus is known from a partial skull, the lower jaw, some of the vertebrae and ribs (pictured) and the hind fin.

=== Hind fin ===
The hind fin is very long and slender, with elongated femur, tibia and fibula. These features suggest a long but not particularly powerful limb, which would have generated a reasonable quantity of lift. Presumably the fore fins also generated lift, or the ichthyosaur would have found itself permanently heading downwards.

=== Vertebrae and ribs ===
The anterior centrum of each vertebra has two symmetrical hollows in, possibly to aid buoyancy. The vertebrae also have ventro-lateral keels, for reasons unknown. Each zygapophysis is very long and extends a long way posteriorly - their articulatory facets are almost totally horizontal.

=== Lower jaw ===
The lower jaw is around 40 cm long and has many conical teeth for spearing fish. On the lateral surface, the articular is anterior to the suprangular.

=== Skull and braincase ===
The skull is mostly disarticulated. Bones we have found are: left quadratojugal, postfrontal, supratemporal, postorbital, basioccipital and both tubera basioccipitalia, the parabasisphenoid, the otic capsule containing both opisthotic and prootic bones, exoccipital, supraoccipital and pterygoid.

==== Quadratojugal ====
This is very similar in shape to the quadratojugals of other large cymbospondylid ichthyosaurs, hence its classification as related to them. It was originally mistaken for the quadrate bone.

==== Postfrontal, supratemporal and postorbital ====
The postfrontal and supratemporal together form the border of the upper temporal fenestra, but unusually, the postorbital has no contact with this fenestra. Again, it is similar to Cymbospondylus and not to Shastasaurus or Mikadocephalus in this respect.

==== Basioccipital ====
As is common in basal ichthyosaurs, the basioccipital can be divided into two sections, the condylus occipitalis and the area extracondylaris. The condylus occipitalis is flattened dorsoventrally, and was probably concave, with a rather saddle-like shape. In this respect it closely resembles that of Cymbospondylus, and probably had an articulation with the atlas vertebra which was more flexible than some ichthyosaurs. Anterior to this part of the bone, the surface is very flat with a slight concavity. The area extracondylaris has high lateral margins which become well-formed tubera basioccipitalia. These are laterally sutured to the opisthotics and extend as far as these bones posteriorly, and about 8 mm in front of the condylus anteriorly. Each tuber basioccipitale is 13 mm in length, 10 mm in width, and rises at least 8 mm above the ventral surface of the basioccipital at the highest point. In life they would have been partially covered by the pterygoid, and also by a layer of cartilage. They would not have been attached to much of the otic capsule.

==== Parabasisphenoid ====
This is only partly preserved, with the cultriform process almost entirely missing. Part of its base is still attached, indicating that it would have been around 15 mm wide at the most posterior point, and not strongly set off from the basal plate of the parasphenoid. This is considered primitive in ichthyosaurs. The basal plate of the parabasisphenoid is roughly rectangular and has the processus basipterygoidei projecting from it. Only the left one of these can be observed due to the left pterygoid disarticulation - in life they would have been attached. The pterygoid has strong facets on the upper surface where this attachment would have taken place. The basal plate was wider than its length of 27 mm, but the actual width cannot be measured as the right pterygoid is still articulated in the natural position. The suture between parabasisphenoid and basioccipital was straight. It is probable that the parabasisphenoid was in contact with the prootic bone, but it was definitely not attached to the opisthotic. Two small foramina, resembling slits, are immediately anterior to the parabasisphenoid-basioccipital suture. They extend anteriorly as canals into the bone and are probably the entrances of the cerebral carotid arteries, although positioned unusually far posteriorly.

==== Opisthotic bones ====
These are the most unusual of the braincase bones, and were previously misidentified as stapes. While they are not stapes, it is difficult to be certain what they are. As mentioned, they are sutured to the tubera basioccipitalia, and so could not have moved freely, meaning that they were not bones for the transmission of sound in this manner. Medially, they are sutured to the posterodorsal margins of the tubera basioccipitalia by a strongly serrate and partially intergrown suture. The posterior surface of this forms a steeply inclined trough running from the suture to the distal extremity of the paraoccipital process. The ventral margin of this trough is formed by a narrow ridge which also divides the posterior and anterior surfaces of the bone. There is another ridge dividing the dorsal third of the bone from this posterior surface. The anterior surface is concave and widens towards the contact with the prootic. This contact must have been tight and strongly sutured, although this has not been preserved. Inside the bones there are many irregular cavities, which could have been part of the membranous inner ear labyrinth. The paraoccipital process is unusually long for an ichthyosaur, around 25 mm, but the entire opisthotic is only 38 mm long. It is also compressed anteroposteriorly, giving it a flattened shape. The medial portion of the opisthotic is also strikingly ossified, which does not resemble many other ichthyosaurs. The exoccipital and opisthotic are tightly connected, which means that, in fact, the foramen metoticum is completely enclosed by these two bones. No other ichthyosaur has this feature. There is another small foramen, probably the foramen nervi hypoglossi, exiting through the exoccipital.

==== Prootic bones ====
These are very badly preserved, and little more than a tight spongy mass of bone remains of each. However, two conclusions can be made - they were tightly sutured to the opisthotic bones and they were unusually well ossified. In an articulated skull they would have been covered by the pterygoid.

==== Exoccipitals ====
As mentioned, these bones were fused without suture to the opisthotic and formed the posterior margin of the foramen metoticum. Apart from this, they were fairly normal for an ichthyosaur, forming two pillars of bone between the basioccipital and the supraoccipital around the foramen occipitale magnum. Their sutures between these two bones were straight and there was little coossification, indicating why the supraoccipital is detached.

==== Supraoccipital ====
The anterior surface of this bone is concave both transversely and dorsoventrally. It has two well-developed foramina endolymphatica, one on each dorsolateral extremity of the concave anterior surface. The dorsal margin is thickened and expanded. Contact with the parietals was probably not strong, hence the unfinished appearance of the dorsal surface. The most unusual feature was that the dorsal surface also had two thick ossifications, with smooth surfaces and wide bases, which cannot be part of the parietal bone. This demonstrates the existence of paired ossifications between the supraoccipital and the parietal, which can only be homologous to the postparietals of basal amniotes. There may be something similar in some species of Cymbospondylus.

==== Pterygoid ====
This is not part of the braincase, but was closely attached to it by several features (see above). The left is better preserved, but disarticulated from the braincase, whereas the right is still attached to the braincase. The palatal ramus is a thin but wide plate of bone, with a ridge reinforcing the medial margin. It also formed the lateral margin of a small interpterygoid fenestra. The basicranial facet is concave and elliptical in shape, anteroposteriorly elongated. Posteromedially to this, a small and pointed process is present, only 5 mm in length. This is in direct contrast to Cymbospondylus, which had a very prominent and well-developed posteromedial process. The quadrate ramus had a concave medial surface, but is not otherwise well preserved. In the articulated state, the pterygoid covered the entire lateral margin of the parabasisphenoid and at least part of the tuber basioccipitale.

== Comparison to related species ==
- The condylus occipitalis was concave. This is similar to Cymbospondylus, but very different from most other Triassic and Jurassic ichthyosaurs.
- The large area extracondylaris appears to be a plesiomorphy with other contemporary ichthyosaurs, as later ichthyosaurs descended from them do not have this feature.
- The otic capsule is different from what is known among other ichthyosaurs, but few can be described adequately due to poor preservation.
- A paraoccipital process is only present in one other ichthyosaur, Shonisaurus, but they are differently shaped.
- Postparietals are not present on other known ichthyosaurs, indicating this to be a plesiomorphy.

In general, the braincase, otic capsules and other parts of the skull more closely resemble basal diapsids such as Youngina than they do other ichthyosaurs, especially later and more derived forms such as Ichthyosaurus and Ophthalmosaurus. These plesiomorphies suggest that classifying ichthyosaurs based on braincase structure is not accurate. However, few other complete braincases have been found from basal ichthyosaurs and so it is difficult to tell.

== See also ==
- List of ichthyosaurs
- List of ichthyosaur type specimens
- Timeline of ichthyosaur research
