= Toretocnemidae =

Toretocnemidae Temporal range: Late Triassic

Scientific classification
- Domain: Eukaryota
- Kingdom: Animalia
- Phylum: Chordata
- Class: Reptilia
- Order: †Ichthyosauria
- Suborder: †Longipinnati
- Family: †Toretocnemidae; Maisch & Matzke, 2000

Genera
- †Qianichthyosaurus; †Toretocnemus

Extinct family of reptiles

The Toretocnemidae were a group of ichthyosaurs that lived in the Late Triassic epoch.
