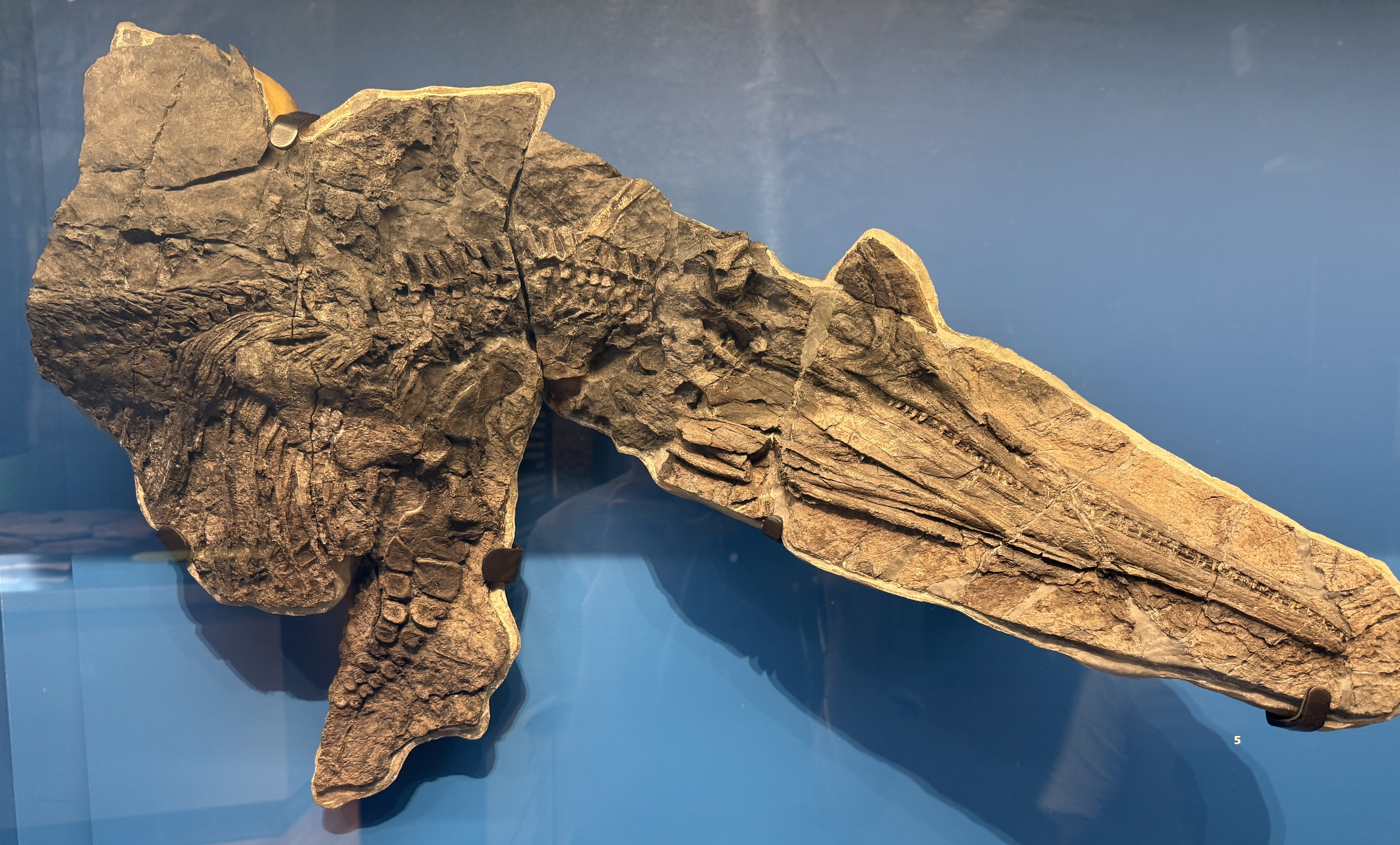
- Callawayia neoscapularis holotype, on display at the Royal Ontario Museum

Scientific classification
- Kingdom: Animalia
- Phylum: Chordata
- Class: Reptilia
- Order: †Ichthyosauria
- Clade: †Euichthyosauria
- Genus: †Callawayia; Maisch & Matzke, 2000

Species
- Callawayia neoscapularis McGowan, 1994 (type) [originally Shastasaurus]

Synonyms
- Shastasaurus neoscapularis McGowan, 1994; Metashastasaurus neoscapularis Nicholls & Manabe, 2001

= Callawayia =

Callawayia Temporal range: Late Triassic, 221.5–212.0 Ma

Extinct genus of reptiles

Callawayia is an extinct genus of ichthyosaur. It contains the species Callawayia neoscapularis.

== History of research ==
In 1994, Christopher McGowan reviewed the taxonomy of Shastasaurus. In this publication, he named a new species of Shastasaurus, S. neoscapularis, based on ROM (Royal Ontario Museum) 41993, a partial skeleton discovered on the shore of Williston Lake in Pink Mountain, British Columbia, Canada in 1987. The specimen was excavated from "Flipper Quarry" in 1988. The name of this species refers to the closer resemblance of its scapulae (shoulder blades) to Jurassic ichthyosaurs than those of other Triassic ichthyosaurs.

In 2000, Michael Maisch published a study on the skull anatomy of Shastasaurus, and also revised the genus again. He noted that S. neoscapularis was quite different from Shastasaurus, and likely represented a new genus. However, on an expedition to the same region as the first specimen by the Royal Tyrell Museum, Elizabeth Nicholls found additional, better-preserved specimens of this species. Knowing this, Maisch did not discuss the species in great detail, instead waiting for Nicholls' study.

However, in a later 2000 publication, Maisch, together with Adreas Matzke, named a new genus, Callawayia, named in honor of ichthyosaur researcher Jack Callaway, for "S." neoscapularis. It was noted that the new material was still under study. In 2001, that study was published, authored by Nicholls and Makoto Manabe. In this publication, they described the anatomy of the two new specimens, TMP 94.380.11 (a smaller specimen representing a juvenile) and TMP 94.382.2 (a larger specimen). A new genus, Metashastasaurus, was proposed for "S." neoscapularis.

Since the name Callawayia predates Metashastasaurus, the former has priority and is the valid name. Nicholls and Manabe, while acknowledging that Callawayia was the correct name, considered its naming unethical, based on the International Code of Zoological Nomenclature's Code of Ethics, as Maisch and Matzke were aware that the study naming Metashastasaurus was in progress when they named Callawayia. Nicholls and Manabe also found the diagnosis proposed by Maisch and Matzke to be problematic, as the latter team had not examined any of the specimens firsthand, resulting in some errors and omitted information. In a 2010 publication, however, Maisch criticized the notion that the naming of Callawayia was unethical, citing that a year had been allowed to pass since he became aware of Nicholls' study, and that he came to the conclusion that Callawayia was distinct from Shastasaurus independently from Nicholls. Ultimately, Maisch did consider the incident "unlucky" due to poor communication between the researchers while conducting their studies, though also stated that the naming was not done with malignant intent.

=== Callawayia wolonggangense ===
In 2007, X. Chen and colleagues named a new species of Callawayia, C. wolonggangse, based on material from Guizhou, China. In 2010, Maisch moved this species to Guizhouichthyosaurus, as G. wolonggangense, noting that it was distinctly different from Callawayia. He considered the characteristics used to differentiate G. wolonggangense unconvincing, however, and that this species was probably just a junior synonym of G. tangae. He still maintained it as provisionally valid though, as detailed investigation had not yet been done.

In 2016, Ji and colleagues found no characteristics uniting "C." wolonggangense and the type species of Callawayia, C. neoscapularis, and thus rejected the assignment of the former species to this genus. However, they found no traits unambiguously linking it to Guizhouichthyosaurus either, thus also rejected its assignment to that genus. Further studies have variably referred to the species as "C." wolonggangense or G. wolonggangense, but phylogenetic analyses have generally found results similar to those of Ji and colleagues, where the species is not found to be the sister taxon of the type species of either genus.

== Description ==
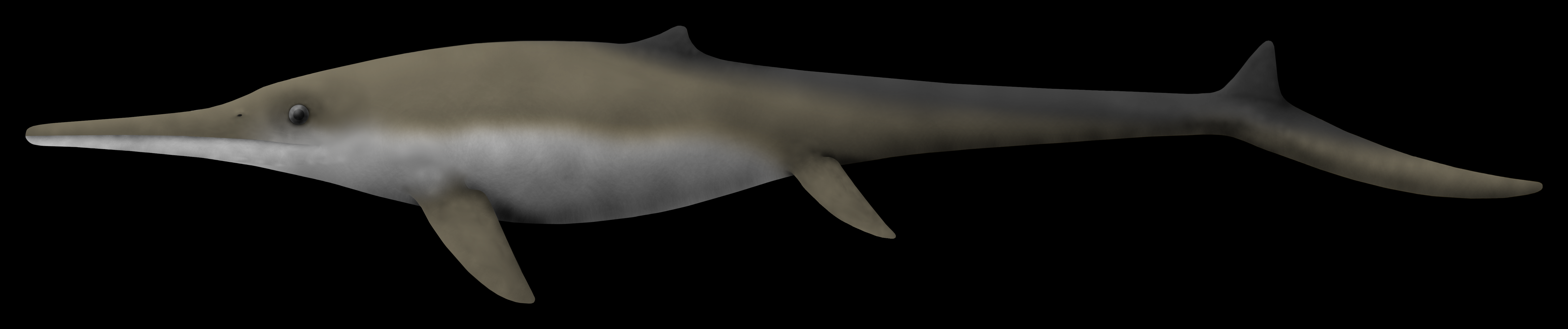
Life restoration

Callawayia is a small ichthyosaur measuring 2–2.5 metres (6.6–8.2 ft) long.

The frontals (a pair of skull roof bones) of Callawayia are large. The do not contact the prefrontals (another pair of skull roof bones) due to the nasals and postfrontals (two other pairs of skull roof bones) touching each other and blocking them. The frontals form part of the border of the temporal fenestrae (openings on top of the skull). There is a strong ridge atop the parietals (a pair of rear skull roof bones), and a prominent shelf projects backwards from these bones. When viewed from the side, two pairs of rear skull bones (the postorbitals and squamosals) are blocked from reaching the temporal fenestrae by the postfrontals and supratemporals (another pair of skull roof bones). The postorbitals do form part of the rims of the fenestrae inside of the skull either.

Callawayia has a total of over 54 vertebrae in front of its hips. The first two neck vertebrae of Callawayia are not fused together. The cervical (neck) ribs are double-headed, unlike the single-headed ribs behind them. The scapulae have long, narrow shafts. The coracoids (the pair of shoulder bones below the scapulae) are wider than they are long. Each pubic bone (front lower hip bone) bears a small opening known as an obturator foramen which, in Callawayia, is not entirely enclosed by bone.

The short, wide humeri (upper arm bones) have notched front edges. The upper ends of the humeri strongly slope upwards from front to back. The part of each humerus that articulates with the radius (front lower arm bone) is projected downwards, while the same surface for the ulna (rear lower arm bone) is projected both downwards and backwards. Among the lower arm bones, the ulnae, while not small, are only about half the size of the radii. A similar condition is present in the lower leg bones, with the tibiae (front lower leg bones) being much larger than the fibulae (rear lower leg bones). An additional bone, known as a pisiform, is present in each foreflipper. The bones making up the front edges of the flippers bear notches on their front edges. There are four digits in the foreflippers, while the hindflippers have only three.

== See also ==
- List of ichthyosaurs
- Timeline of ichthyosaur research
