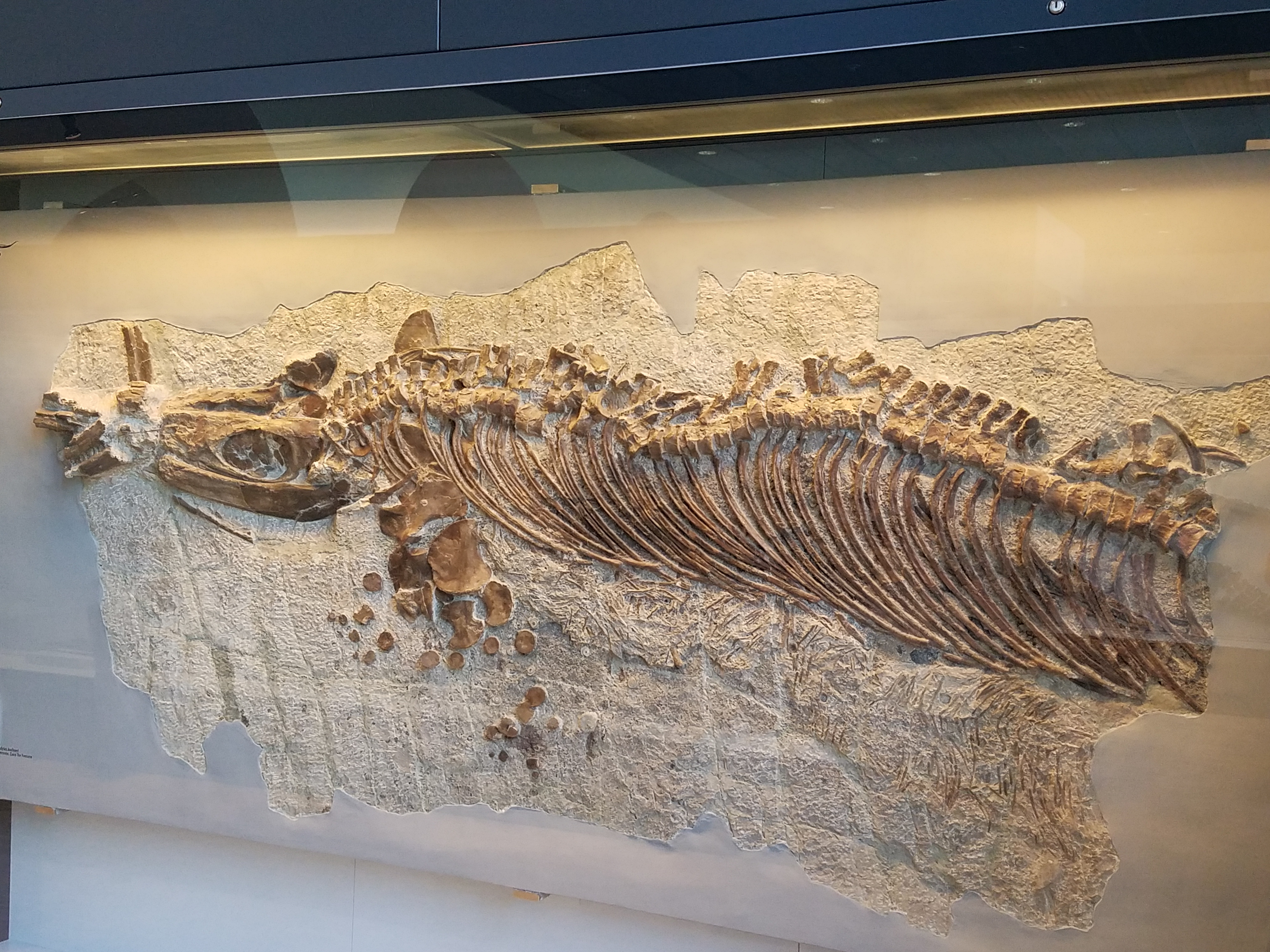
- Cymbospondylus buchseri fossil at the Palaeontological Museum of the University of Zurich

Scientific classification
- Kingdom: Animalia
- Phylum: Chordata
- Class: Reptilia
- Order: †Ichthyosauria
- Node: †Hueneosauria
- Suborder: †Longipinnati
- Family: †Cymbospondylidae; Huene, 1948

Genera
- †Cymbospondylus; †Pachygonosaurus?; †Pessopteryx?; †Phantomosaurus?; †Thalattoarchon?; †Xinminosaurus?

= Cymbospondylidae =

Cymbospondylidae Temporal range: Early Triassic to Late Triassic, 251–210 Ma

Extinct family of reptiles

Cymbospondylidae is an extinct family of hueneosaurian Ichthyosaurs known from the Middle Triassic of Europe, North America, and Asia.

== Taxonomy ==
Cymbospondylidae is a basal clade of ichthyosaurs. In 2000, Maischand and Matzke recovered cymbospondylids as members of Hueneosauria and more derived than mixosaurids, but Ji and colleagues found cymbospondylids to be outside of Hueneosauria in 2015. These two studies defined the group in two different ways, with the former defining it as the least inclusive clade containing both Cymbospondylus petrinus and Phantomosaurus neubigi, whereas the latter defined it as the least inclusive clade containing both Cymbospondylus piscosus and Xinminosaurus catactes.
