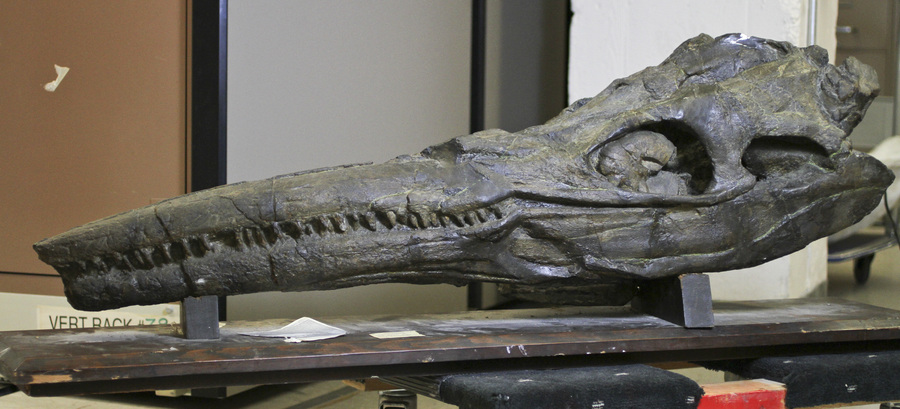
- Partial skull of Cymbospondylus petrinus

Scientific classification
- Domain: Eukaryota
- Kingdom: Animalia
- Phylum: Chordata
- Class: Reptilia
- Order: †Ichthyosauria
- Node: †Hueneosauria; Maisch & Matzke, 2000

Subgroups
- †Mixosauridae; †Longipinnati; †Cymbospondylidae; †Toretocnemidae; †Merriamosauria

= Hueneosauria =

Hueneosauria Temporal range: Early Triassic - Late Cretaceous

Extinct group of ichthyosaurs

The Hueneosauria are a group of Ichthyosauria, living during the Mesozoic.

In 2000, Michael Werner Maisch and Andreas Matzke defined a node clade Hueneosauria as the group consisting of the last common ancestor of Mixosaurus cornalianus and Ophthalmosaurus icenicus; and all of its descendants. The clade is named after Friedrich von Huene, a German paleontologist who was a leading ichthyosaur expert in the early twentieth century.

The Hueneosauria contain the more derived ichthyosaurs, which have the morphology of a fish. The group originated in the early Triassic and became extinct during the Cretaceous.
