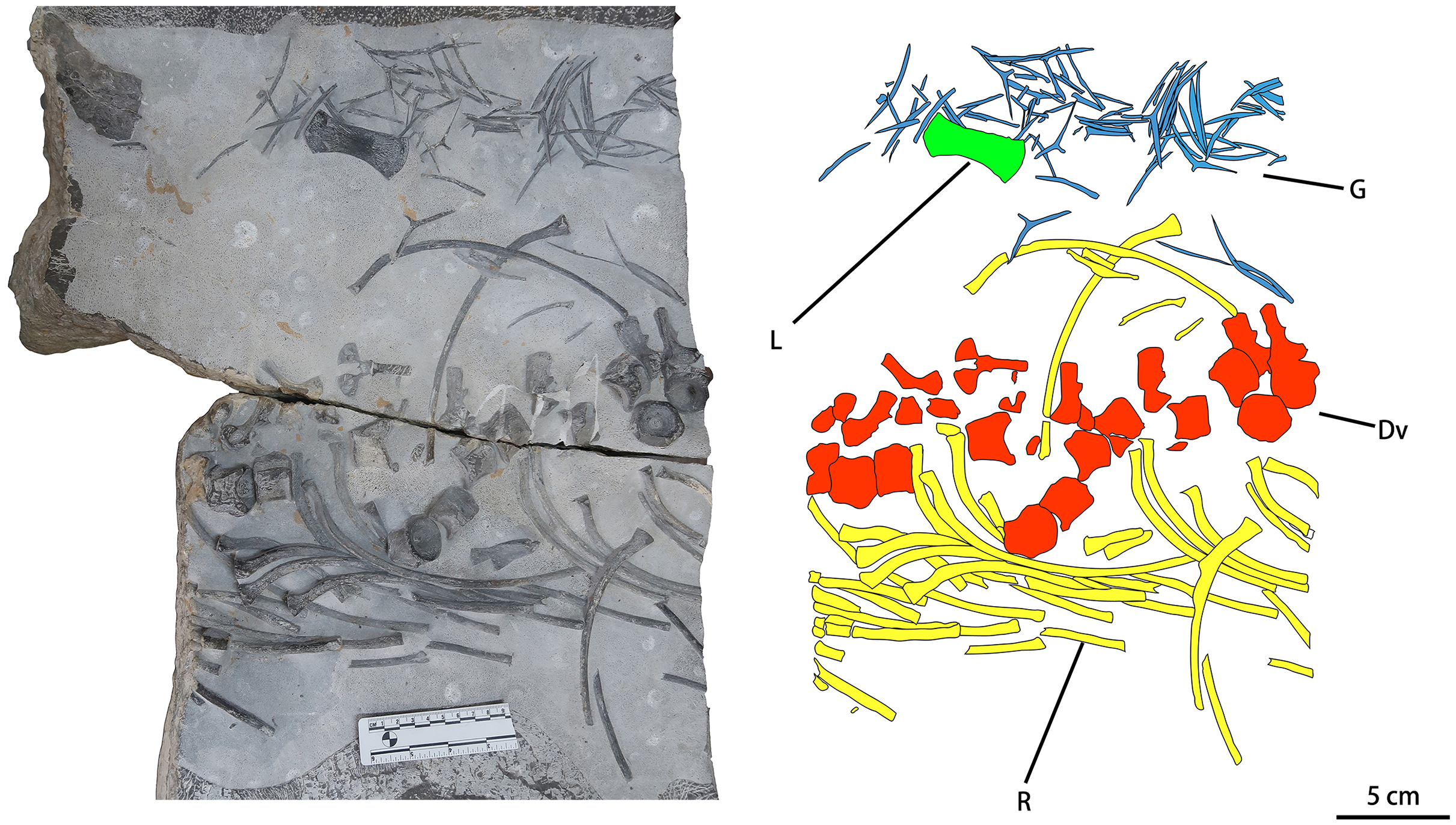
- Holotype specimen

Scientific classification
- Kingdom: Animalia
- Phylum: Chordata
- Class: Reptilia
- Clade: †Ichthyosauromorpha
- Genus: †Baisesaurus; Ren et al., 2022
- Species: †B. robustus

Binomial name
- †Baisesaurus robustus Ren et al., 2022

= Baisesaurus =

Baisesaurus Temporal range: Early Triassic (late Olenekian), late Spathian subage

Extinct genus of ichthyosauromorph

Baisesaurus (meaning "Baise lizard") is an extinct genus of ichthyosauromorph marine reptile from the early Triassic (Olenekian age) Luolou Formation of Guangxi, China. The genus contains a single species, Baisesaurus robustus, known from a partial postcranial skeleton.

== Discovery and naming ==
The Baisesaurus robustus holotype specimen, CUGW VH107, was discovered in 2018 in a layer of the Luolou Formation (Triassospathodus symmetricus–T. homeri conodont assemblage zones) in the Nanpanjiang Basin of Zhebao Township in Baise prefecture of Guangxi, China. The specimen consists of assorted ribs, gastralia, a limb element (likely a radius), twelve vertebral centra, and seven neural arches.

In 2022, Ren et al. described Baisesaurus robustus, a new genus and species of basal ichthyosauromorph. The generic name, "Baisesaurus", combines a reference to the type locality in Baise, China, with the Greek "saurus", meaning "lizard". The specific name, "robustus", means "robust".

== Description and classification ==
Baisesaurus was likely at least 3 m (9.8 ft) long. It was more similar to Utatsusaurus than to any other ichthyosauromorph, with similar size and anatomical traits. It can be inferred from related animals that Baisesaurus was a strong swimmer with long, compact forelimb bones.

Baisesaurus represents a basal member of the clade Ichthyosauromorpha, though its exact relationships are unclear. In their 2022 description, Ren and colleagues argued that it is not a member of the clades Hupehsuchia or Omphalosauridae (Nasorostra). By definition, it would then be a member of the more derived clade Ichthyopterygia, though they emphasized that such a classification is tentative.

In their 2026 description of the omphalosaurid Ammonitritor, Sander and colleagues noted the potential difficulty in distinguishing omphalosaurids from ichthyopterygians based on postcrania alone. They briefly considered the possibility that Baisesaurus is actually an omphalosaurid based on vertebral similarities to Ammonitritor.
