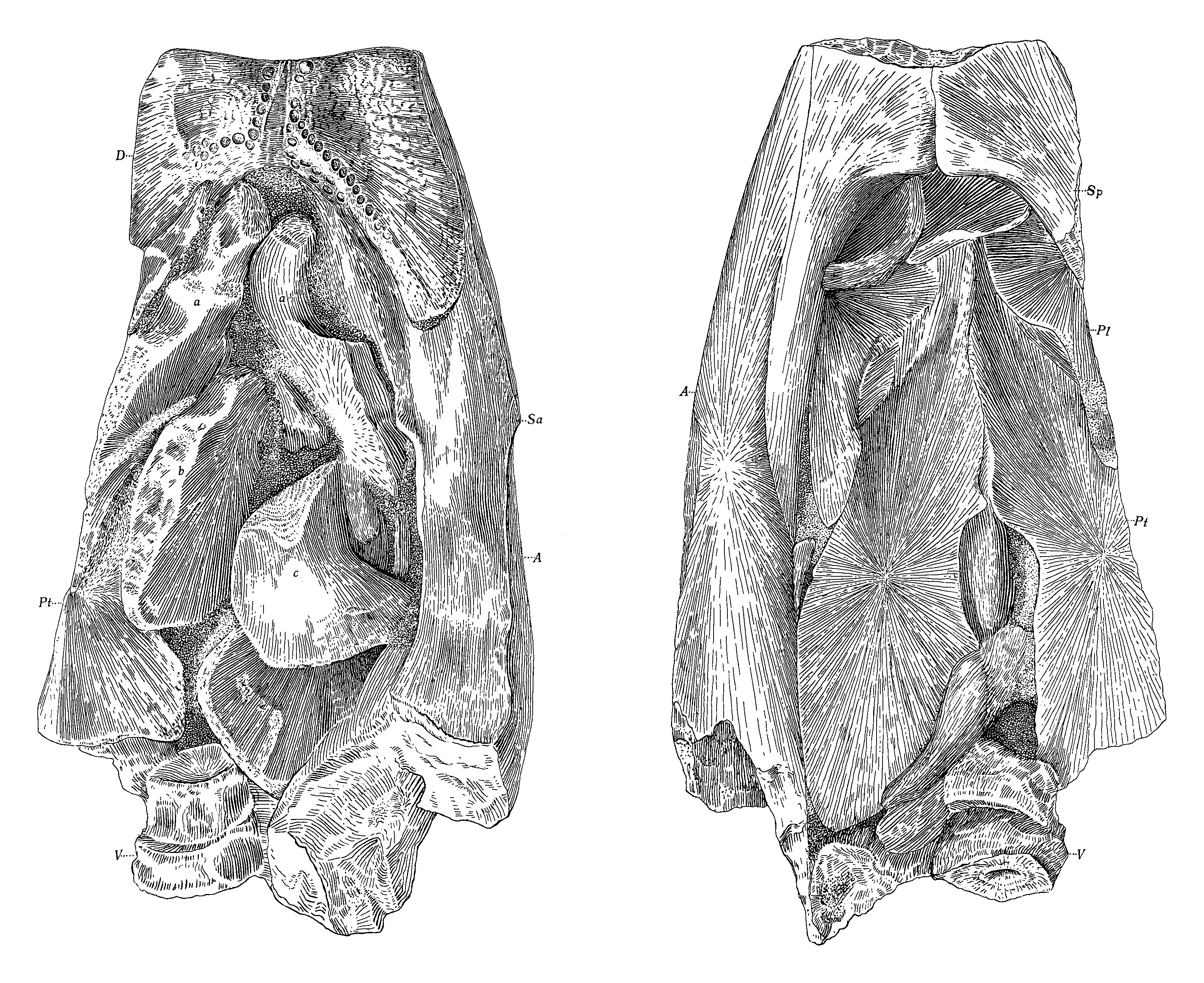
- Holotype skull and vertebrae of O. nevadanus seen from above (left) and below (right)

Scientific classification
- Kingdom: Animalia
- Phylum: Chordata
- Class: Reptilia
- Clade: †Ichthyosauriformes
- Family: †Omphalosauridae
- Genus: †Omphalosaurus; Merriam 1906

Species
- †O. nevadanus Merriam 1906 (type); †O. merriami Maisch 2010; †O. nisseri? (Wiman, 1910); †O. nettarhynchus Mazin & Bucher, 1987; †O. wolfi Tichy, 1995

= Omphalosaurus =

Omphalosaurus Temporal range: Early–Middle Triassic, 252–237 Ma

Extinct genus of reptiles

Omphalosaurus (from Greek, meaning "button lizard", for their button-like teeth) is an extinct genus of marine reptile from the Early Triassic to Middle Triassic. It is a member of the ichthyosauriform family Omphalosauridae. Most of what is known about Omphalosaurus is based on multiple jaw fragments, ribs, and vertebrae. Specimens of Omphalosaurus have been described from the western United States, Poland, Austria, and the island of Spitsbergen off the northern coast of Norway.

== Description ==
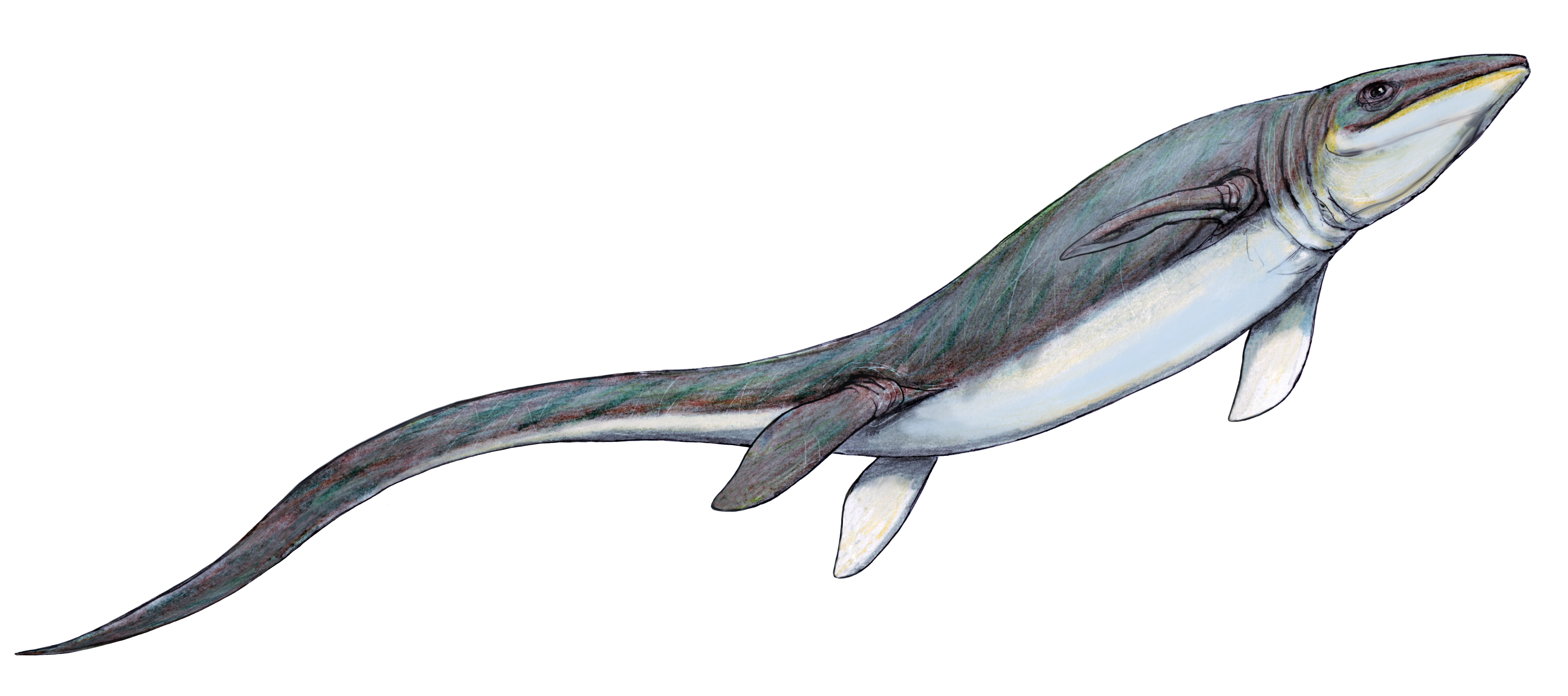
Life restoration of O. nevadanus

Omphalosaurus is a moderately large and plump marine reptile, measuring 5 m (16 ft) long and weighing more than 783 kg (1,726 lb). It is best known for its highly specialized dentition compared to other ichthyosaurs. The teeth are button-like, with a dome shape when viewed laterally and almost circular crowns that have an irregular enamel surface akin to the texture of an orange peel. Individual teeth do not exceed 12mm in diameter and are arranged in tooth plates exclusively on the premaxilla, which sit at 90º from each other, and dentary. Based on O. nevadanus' well preserved and smooth palatine, it is unlikely that Omphalosaurus had palatine teeth akin to placodonts. Nonetheless, Omphalosaurus teeth could potentially number in the hundreds and are concentrated along the skull midline. Each species has varying degrees of tooth organization, but O. nevadanus has the most neatly organized teeth, which most closely resemble distinct rows despite some unevenness. Attempts have been made to count the number of rows of teeth for the other species, but they are mostly irregularly patterned on the occlusal surface.

The upper tooth plates form a convex surface, while the lower plate is concave. They were previously thought to have short, broad jaws and powerful bite forces, but recent reconstruction indicates that the dentary symphysis is elongated and connects at an approximately 15º angle, giving the jaw a long "V" shape. If reconstructed, the lower jaw of O. nevadanus could potentially exceed 50 cm in length.

Jaw fragments have revealed that Omphalosaurus had dental batteries that were optimized for constant wear, with high tooth replacement rates. Omphalosaurus is unusual in that their immature replacement teeth and mature teeth had different enamel microstructure. Like other Ichthyosaurs, Omphalosaurus has a microunit enamel in its mature teeth, while replacement teeth have columnar enamel. It is currently unknown how this transformation occurs.

Aside from dentition, Omphalosaurus is relatively poorly known, save for a small number of ribs and presacral vertebrae attributed to O. wolfi. The ribs are swollen and hollow, which is a common characteristic in amniotes returning to water, and the vertebrae are deeply amphicoelous. Omphalosaurus has lost the neural arch atop the centra of the vertebrae. Their bones have woven-fibered bone tissue, indicating rapid rate of bone growth.

== Paleobiology ==
=== Diet ===
Omphalosaurus' highly specialized dentition indicates that they were durophagous animals. Their teeth were optimized for heavy wear, and CT scans indicate they had high rates of replacement to deal with a hard diet. However, they lacked the gripping dentition needed to grab prey, and the narrow jaw and anterior tooth placement do not match the short, massive skulls and jaws of other species with the strong bite force required to break shells. The combination of highly worn teeth and low bite force is more similar to herbivores and ornithopod dinosaurs. Like ornithopods, Omphalosaurus has a high rate of tooth replacement and smooth secondary occlusal surfaces, but the lack of fibrous marine plants during the Middle Triassic makes it unlikely that it was herbivorous. Ammonites and pseudoplanctonic halobiid bivalves were, on the contrary, common in Omphalosaurus' range and time period, and their shells were hard but thin. Sander and Faber hypothesized that Omphalosaurus could have had fleshy cheeks and used suction feeding to make up for the lack of grasping dentition, and could then proceed to grind through the shells, allowing them to feed on these animals. Recent evidence suggests that they focused their hunting on ammonites over bivalves, the latter of which is preferred by placodonts.

=== Decompression sickness ===
Like other early Ichthyosaurs, there is no evidence of avascular necrosis in Omphalosaurus, indicating that they were likely not subjected to decompression sickness. Rothschild et al. attributed this to the lack of large aquatic predators in the early to middle Triassic, which meant that Omphalosaurus would not have needed to quickly dive to escape. Furthermore, it seems likely that early Ichthyosaurs typically moved slowly up and down the water column, or may have had physiological protection for quick water pressure changes.

== Discovery and classification ==
The first fossil Omphalosaurus was found in 1902 by V. C. Osmont in Nevada, United States, and it was first described in 1906 by John C. Merriam. Merriam did not identify the fossil O. nevadanus as Ichthyosaurian, suggesting instead placodont or rhynchosaurus affinities. The first to identify Omphalosaurus as an ichthyosaur was Kuhn in 1934, and Mazin justified the grouping in 1983. In 1997 and 2000, Motani argued against the assignment, citing the lack of basal synapomorphies of Ichthyopterygia and suggesting sauropterygian affinities. However, Maisch described a new species in 2010 and restated its affinity with Ichthyosauria.

Omphalosaurus are currently considered small-to-medium-sized Ichthyosaurs. Like other Ichthyosaurs, they have deeply amphicoelous vertebrae with no distinct transverse processes, and their centra are shorter than they are wide. The ribs of Omphalosaurus share the dorsoventral articulation of the Ichthyosaurian family Shastasauridae, and O. wolfi was shown to have the same cancellous bone structure as Ichthyosaurs, though this is common in several other aquatic species. One of the most distinct traits placing Omphalosaurus within Ichthyosauria is that they share the same microunit enamel in mature teeth that Ichthyosaurs are known to have, but that is rare in other reptiles.

The most prominent feature that has created controversy in the assignment of Omphalosaurus is the placement of the teeth. Unlike other Ichthyosaurs, for which teeth form distinct rows, Omphalosaurus teeth form an irregular pavement. Additionally, no other Ichthyosaurs have maxillary grinding surfaces at right angles to each other. The tooth crowns of Omphalosaurus are lower and more irregular than other durophagous Ichthyosaurs, and the enamel typically has an orange-peel textured surface rather than Ichthyosaurs' typical longitudinal wrinkles. Omphalosaurus also has hollow ribs and a humerus with a prominent deltopectoral crest, neither of which are found in other Ichthyosaurs.

=== Species ===
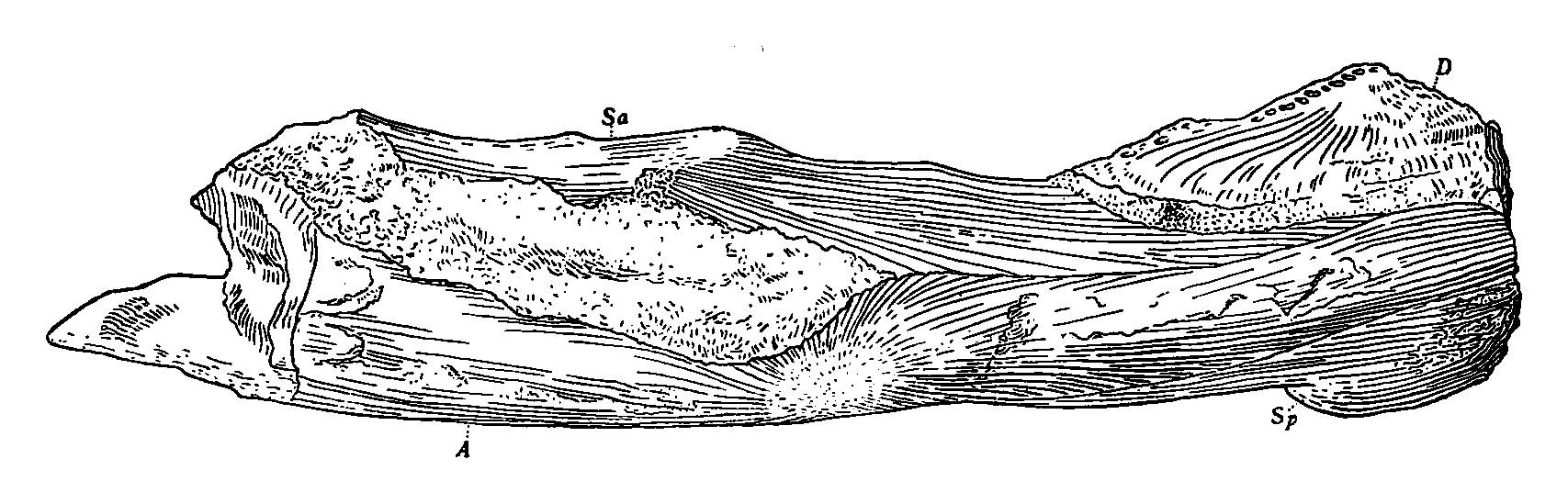
Right side of O. nevadanus lower jaw

- Omphalosaurus nevadanus is the type specimen of the genus, and one of the two species found in the marine Prida Formation in the Humboldt Range of Nevada, United States. O. nevadanus originates from the Middle Triassic Anisian beds and was first described by Merriam in 1906. The fossils consist of the inferior portion of the cranium with anterior cervical vertebrae and a portion of the mandible that has lost the articular and is broken before the symphysis. The angular, supraangular, dentary, and splenial are all visible on the mandible. Unlike the other species, it has a rounded posterior margin of the dentary symphysis. O. nevadanus is much larger than O. nettarhynchus and has more numerous teeth.
- Omphalosaurus merriami originates from the marine Sticky Keep Formation in Svalbard, and was described by Maisch in 2010. It lived in the lower Triassic period. The fossil consists of jaw fragments that were initially thought to be part of Pessopteryx nisseri, which it was found with, until the jaw was found to be distinctly omphalosaurian. The jaw fragments have three rows of teeth with smooth enamel and tooth roots containing plicidentine. However, in 2013, Erin Maxwell and Benjamin Kear were unable to find species-level diagnostic features on the O. merriami specimens, and considered them too poorly preserved to base a species on. They therefore regarded O. merriami as a nomen dubium.
- Omphalosaurus nettarhynchus is the second species found in the Prida Formation, originating in the Middle Triassic Spathian beds. It was first described by Mazin and Bucher in 1987. The fossil consists only of a fragmentary lower jaw, but O. nettarhynchus is distinguishable from other species due to its smaller size, relatively few but large teeth, and laterally expanded jaw symphysis.
- Omphalosaurus wolfi is a Middle Triassic, early Ladinian species found in the Northern Alpes on Dürrnberg Mountain, in Lercheck Limestone. It was found by G. Wolf in 1991 and described by Tichy in 1995. The specimen consists of several presacral vertebrae that are deeply amphicoelous and short compared to height and width, ribs that were swollen and hollow, and a disarticulated skull with a partially articulated lower jaw. O. wolfi's dentition resembles that of O. nisseri, while its lower jaw elements are similar to O. nevadanus, the only other species found with significant skull material. Ten other unidentified skull bones and a bone that may be a humerus were also found. O. wolfi was suggested to actually be O. cf. nevadanus by Sander and Faber in 2003, but Maisch argued that re-investigation of cranial material was needed and that O. wolfi should stand as a species until then. Sander et al. (2026) supported the validity and distinction of O. wolfi based on its large body size, comparatively high tooth count, and distinct maxilla morphology.
- An Omphalosaurus sp. left humerus from the Middle Triassic was found in the Muschelkalk of Franconia, Germany, specifically in the Hohenlohe beds of the Garnberg Quarry. It is from the late Ladinian and was found by Hagdorn in 1984, then described by Sander and Faber in 1998. The humerus displayed the typical Ichthyosaurian cancellous bone structure, but its specific species remains unclear.

=== Contested species ===
- Pessopteryx nisseri is a Spitsbergen fossil composed of several species found and described by Wiman in 1910, including the jaw fragments now attributed to O. merriami. It was considered O. nisseri by Wiman and Mazin, but it has also been regarded to be its own species and Pessopteryx its own genus based on the limb and pectoral girdle fossils that are of ichthyosaurian nature. In their 2026 publication on omphalosaurid diversity, Sander et al. considered this species to belong to the genus Omphalosaurus (O. nisseri). They regarded the hypodigm as non-diagnostic based on the limited available data.
- "Omphalosaurus" peyeri was from the Middle Anisian period. It was buried in the porous arenitic limestone of the Schaumkalk beds at Rüdersdorf, which are thought to be from a shallow aquatic environment that surfaced episodically, meaning that "O." peyeri was likely a coastal inhabitant. The fossil is an incomplete posterior portion of the left maxilla with 3 mature, mushroom-shaped teeth and several more replacement teeth below. Unlike the other Omphalosaurus species, "O." peyeri had just one row of functional and relatively few replacement teeth. Because of this, it was initially thought to be a placodont until it was described as Omphalosaurus by Maisch and Lehmann in 2002 due to the typically Omphalosaurus tooth shape and orange peel texture of the enamel crown. It was thought to be the most basal Omphalosaurus species. This classification was contested by Wintrich and Sander due to the placodont-like columnar enamel. A detailed reassessment in 2017 using CT data supported an identification for the "O." peyeri holotype as belonging to an indeterminate species of Placodus.

== Classification ==
In their 2026 description of the omphalosaurid Ammonitritor, Sander et al. (2026) included it in an updated version of the phylogenetic matrix of Fang et al. (2024) to test its relationships with other members of the family. Their best-resolved parsimony tree placed Ammonitritor in a position diverging after Cartorhynchus but before Sclerocormus and Omphalosaurus spp. Contrasting with previous analyses which have treated all species of Omphalosaurus within a single operational taxonomic unit (OTU), these researchers scored three OTUs based on their observations. O. merriami and O. nettarhynchus were too fragmentary for their analyses. The classification of "O." peyeri within this genus is contested, likely being a placodont. These results are displayed in the cladogram below:

- †Ichthyosauromorpha
  - Hupehsuchia
  - Ichthyosauriformes
    - Omphalosauridae
      - Cartorhynchus lenticarpus
      - - Ammonitritor scientiacivium
        - - Sclerocormus parviceps
          - "Omphalosaurus" nisseri
          - - Omphalosaurus nevadanus
            - Omphalosaurus wolfi
    - Ichthyopterygia
      - Chaohusaurus spp.
      - Eoichthyosauria
        - Grippidia
        - Ichthyosauria

== See also ==
- List of ichthyosaurs
- Timeline of ichthyosaur research
