= Ammonitritor =

Ammonitritor Temporal range: Early Triassic, upper Olenekian (Spathian)

Scientific classification
- Kingdom: Animalia
- Phylum: Chordata
- Class: Reptilia
- Clade: †Ichthyosauriformes
- Family: †Omphalosauridae
- Genus: †Ammonitritor; Sander et al., 2026
- Species: †A. scientiacivium

Binomial name
- †Ammonitritor scientiacivium Sander et al., 2026

Genus of ichthyosauriform

Ammonitritor (lit. 'ammonite grinder') is an extinct genus of early ichthyosauriform in the family Omphalosauridae, known from the Early Triassic (Olenekian age) Vikinghøgda Formation of Norway. The genus contains a single species, Ammonitritor scientiacivium, known from a nearly complete skull and partial vertebral column. This specimen is the first described skull of an omphalosaurid to be preserved in three dimensions, contrasting with the flattened skulls of other members of this clade.

== Discovery and naming ==
A. scientiacivium type locality in Svalbard

The Ammonitritor fossil material was discovered by Felix Saludes during a 2010 expedition led by Luc Ebbo to outcrops of the Vikinghøgda Formation (Vendomdalen Member). These rock layers—part of the Grippia Niveau (lit. 'Grippia level')—are located on Vikinghøgda mountain's northwest slope, a site near the Sassendalen glacial valley on Spitsbergen island of Svalbard, Norway.

The specimen was preserved within a calcareous septarian concretion that had broken into several pieces. Once collected, the fragments were reassembled, and Ebbo prepared the concretion in 2020. Four years later, casts of the specimen were produced and eventually sent to museums in Sweden, Switzerland, China, and the United States. The original specimen is now housed in Ebbo's Paléogalerie in Salignac, France, under specimen number PGE LE 2024.0.264. It consists of a nearly complete skull and mandible preserved alongside several vertebrae from the neck and possibly the trunk. Notably, while the skull is partially disarticulated and some elements (braincase and palate) are missing, the parts that are present are preserved three-dimensionally. This makes it the first omphalosaurid specimen known from a 3D skull, contrasting with those of all other omphalosaurids, which are crushed, flattened, or incomplete to some extent.

In 2026, P. Martin Sander, Luc Ebbo, and colleagues described Ammonitritor scientiacivium as a new genus and species of omphalosaurid ichthyosauriform based on these fossil remains, designating PGE LE 2024.0.264 as the holotype specimen. The generic name, Ammonitritor, combines 'ammonite' with the Latin tritor, meaning 'grinder', alluding to the taxon's possible diet and means of feeding. The specific name, scientiacivium, is derived from the Latin words scientia ('science') and civis ('citizen'), honoring the contributions of citizen scientists to paleontology, including those that resulted in the discovery and description of this species.

== Classification ==
To test the affinities and relationships of Ammonitritor, Sander et al. (2026) included it in an updated version of the phylogenetic matrix of Fang et al. (2024). Their best-resolved parsimony tree placed Ammonitritor as a member of the ichthyosauriform family Omphalosauridae, diverging after Cartorhynchus but before Sclerocormus and Omphalosaurus spp. These results are displayed in the cladogram below:

- †Ichthyosauromorpha
  - Hupehsuchia
  - Ichthyosauriformes
    - Omphalosauridae
      - Cartorhynchus lenticarpus
      - - Ammonitritor scientiacivium
        - - Sclerocormus parviceps
          - Omphalosaurus nisseri
          - - Omphalosaurus nevadanus
            - Omphalosaurus wolfi
    - Ichthyopterygia
      - Chaohusaurus spp.
      - Eoichthyosauria
        - Grippidia
        - Ichthyosauria
