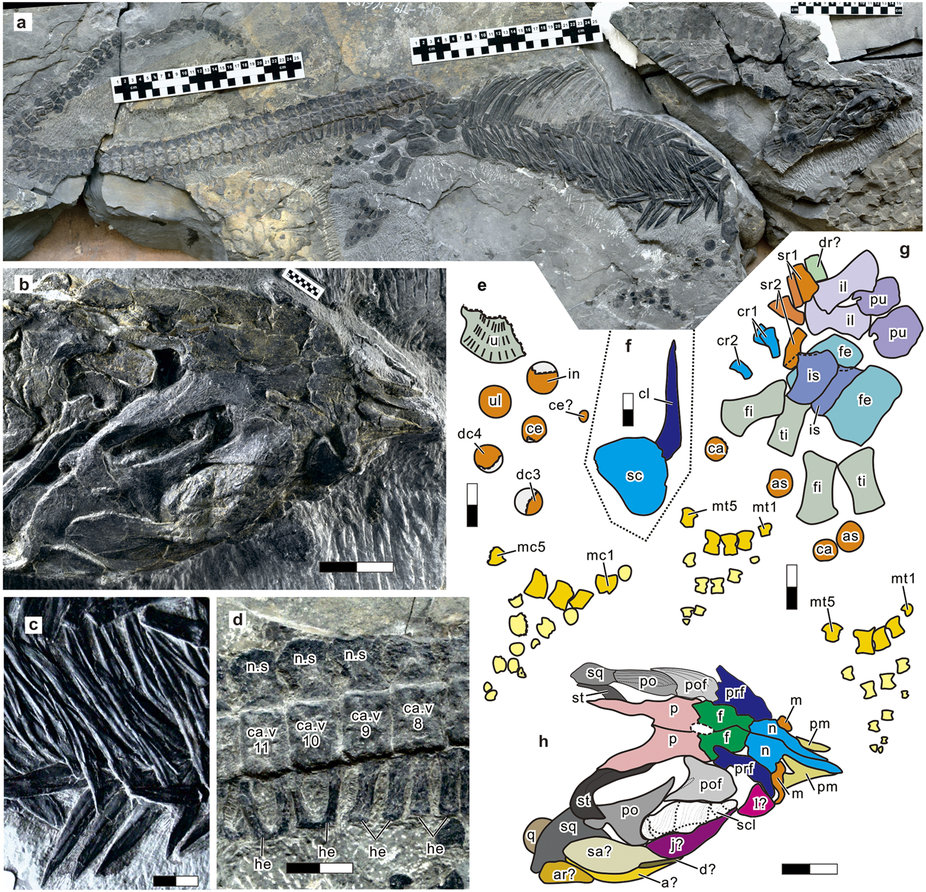
- Holotype

Scientific classification
- Kingdom: Animalia
- Phylum: Chordata
- Class: Reptilia
- Clade: †Ichthyosauromorpha
- Clade: †Ichthyosauriformes
- Clade: †Nasorostra
- Genus: †Sclerocormus; Jiang et al., 2016
- Species: †S. parviceps

Binomial name
- †Sclerocormus parviceps Jiang et al., 2016

= Sclerocormus =

Sclerocormus Temporal range: Early Triassic, 248 Ma

Extinct genus of reptiles

Sclerocormus is an extinct genus of ichthyosauriform from the early Triassic period. The fossil was discovered in the central Anhui Province, China. It is currently only known from one specimen, however the fossil is mostly complete and as such further increases the understanding of the early evolution of ichthyosaurs.

== Description ==
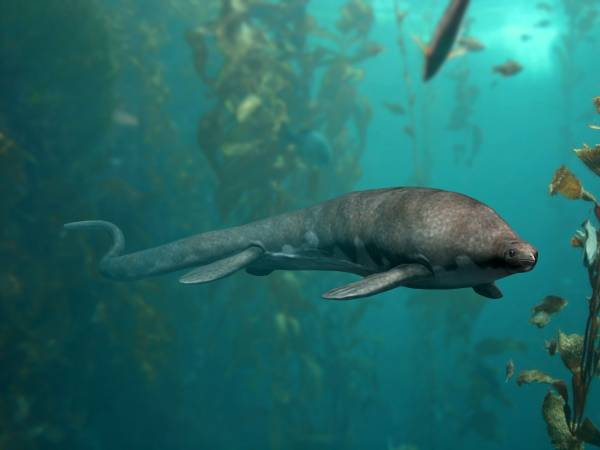
Restoration

Sclerocormus is much larger than its closest relative Cartorhynchus, with a total body length of 1.6 m (5.2 ft) and body mass of more than 15 kg (33 lb). Its proportions were unusual amongst basal ichthyosauriformes, with a short, heavily built trunk, a very long tail over 92 cm long (58% of the total body length), and a small skull with a short, narrow snout and toothless jaws.

Like Cartorhynchus, the skull of Sclerocormus is wide, with a short, edentulous snout much narrower than the skull roof. The skull is unusually short at only 6.25% of its body length, compared to 12% in Chaohusaurus and 15% in Hupehsuchus. Unusually, the nasals of Sclerocormus extend to the tip of the snout, a trait which it shares with Cartorhynchus. The snout is very short, only 30% of the total skull length. By contrast, the orbits are very large, occupying over a third of the skull length. The upper temporal fenestrae are large, possibly indicating a strong bite force despite its lack of teeth.

The trunk is short and heavily built, with broad and flattened ribs. The ribcage is deepest at the shoulders and gradually becomes shallower, forming a straight, constant slope, similar to Cartorhynchus but in contrast to the more rounded underside seen in other ichthyosauromorphs. An extensive gastral rib basket runs along the underside in two parallel series on each side. Particularly, the inner of the two series are composed of flat, overlapping triangular pieces of bone that resemble the condition in hupehsuchians. The cervical and dorsal vertebrae bear tall, vertical neural spines that are broadened so as to leave little space between each spine. This resembles the condition in Hupehsuchia, but is unlike the well-spaced, posteriorly inclined spines of basal ichthyopterygians. The caudal neural spines in contrast are lower than they are wide and have rounded tips. The tail itself is very long and slender, composed of at least 67 caudal vertebrae, and does not appear to have had a fluke. The haemal arches possess a unique morphology, where only the ninth pair and onwards are fused distally, however unlike other diapsids they are not V- or Y-shaped in cranial view, but U-shaped. Small dermal ossicles were reported from the cervical region, ranging in size between 2–5 mm, and curiously resemble the pelvic ossicles of saurosphargids. There are no ossicles present over the neural spines, unlike in hupehsuchians.

== Discovery and naming ==
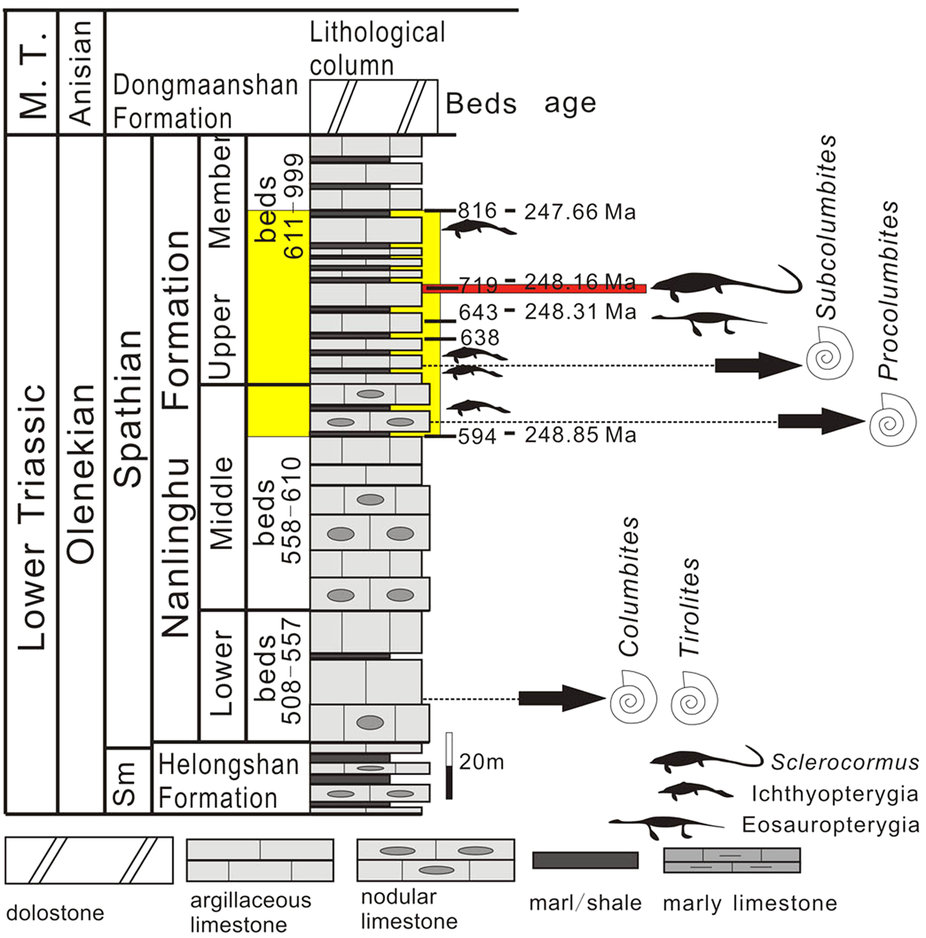
Stratigraphic horizon

The full binomial name, Sclerocormus parviceps, comes from the Greek words for 'stiff trunk' (σκληρός, skleros and κορμός, kormos) and the Latin words for 'small skull' (parvus and caput).

== Classification ==
In the phylogenetic analysis performed by Jiang et al. (2016), Sclerocormus was found to be a basal ichthyosaurform and a sister taxon to Cartorhynchus. Jiang et al. erected the new clade Nasorostra ('nose beak') for these two taxa, itself a sister taxon to Ichthyopterygia. As with other recent analyses, Ichthyosauriformes and Hupehsuchia are recognised as sister clades in Ichthyosauromorpha.

As the holotype of Cartorhynchus was potentially not fully mature, it was possible Sclerocormus simply represented a large or mature Cartorhynchus. However, it was established this was not the case, as there were significant anatomical differences between the two genera, including different presacral vertebral counts and the form of the gastralia, that could distinguish between the two taxa.

Later work revealed that the clade Nasorostra is synonymous with the earlier-named Omphalosauridae, as Omphalosaurus share more features with these Chinese taxa than previously recognized. In their 2026 description of the European omphalosaurid Ammonitritor, Sander et al. recovered the following topology for this family, with Sclerocormus most closely related to Omphalosaurus spp.

- †Ichthyosauromorpha
  - Hupehsuchia
  - Ichthyosauriformes
    - Omphalosauridae
      - Cartorhynchus lenticarpus
      - - Ammonitritor scientiacivium
        - - Sclerocormus parviceps
          - Omphalosaurus nisseri
          - - Omphalosaurus nevadanus
            - Omphalosaurus wolfi
    - Ichthyopterygia
      - Chaohusaurus spp.
      - Eoichthyosauria
        - Grippidia
        - Ichthyosauria

== Palaeobiology ==
Due to its heavy build and body shape, Sclerocormus likely inhabited shallow waters, as with Cartorhynchus, and was probably a slow swimmer. The narrow, toothless snout indicates Sclerocormus was likely a suction feeder, using its snout to generate syringe-like pressure concentration to suck in soft-bodied prey. Due to the small size of its jaws and head relative to its body, Sclerocormus would have been limited to feeding on prey much smaller than itself.
