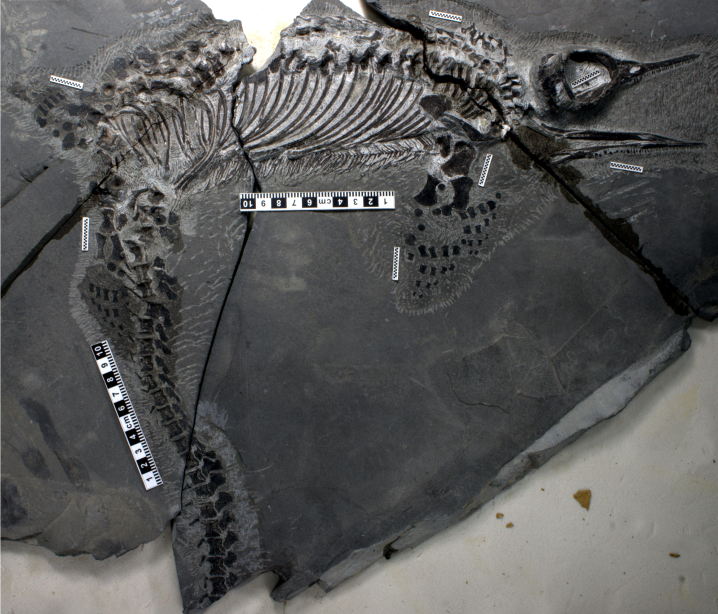
- Chaohusaurus

Scientific classification
- Kingdom: Animalia
- Phylum: Chordata
- Class: Reptilia
- Clade: †Ichthyosauromorpha
- Clade: †Ichthyosauriformes; Motani et al., 2014

Subgroups
- †Chaohusaurus; †Ichthyopterygia; †Omphalosauridae

= Ichthyosauriformes =

Ichthyosauriformes Temporal range: Early Triassic - Late Cretaceous, 251.3–90 Ma

Group of marine reptiles

The Ichthyosauriformes are a group of marine reptiles, belonging to the Ichthyosauromorpha, that lived during the Mesozoic. Members of this group may be informally termed ichthyosaurs, though this term is also used for the smaller group Ichthyopterygia.

The stem clade Ichthyosauriformes was in 2014 defined by Ryosuke Motani and colleagues as the group consisting of all ichthyosauromorphs that are more closely related to Ichthyosaurus communis than to Hupehsuchus nanchangensis. Their synapomorphies include the possession of a long nasal bone, stretching to the front beyond the nostril; large scleral rings, filling the eye sockets; a narrow snout in top view; and converging digits with little space between them.

The Ichthyosauriformes probably split off in the Early Triassic, about 250 million years ago; the last known forms lived in the middle Cretaceous. The clade is divided into the early-diverging Omphalosauridae as well as the Ichthyopterygia, which contains the Ichthyosauria and allies. The last ichthyosaurs probably became extinct in the middle Cretaceous. The general relationships of these clades are shown in the cladogram below, based on the results of Sander et al. (2026):

- †Ichthyosauromorpha
  - Hupehsuchia
    - Nanchangosaurus suni
    - - Eohupehsuchus brevicollis
      - - Hupehsuchus nanchangensis
        - - Eretmorhipis carrolldongi
          - Parahupehsuchus longus
  - Ichthyosauriformes
    - Omphalosauridae
      - Cartorhynchus lenticarpus
      - - Ammonitritor scientiacivium
        - - Sclerocormus parviceps
          - Omphalosaurus nisseri
          - - Omphalosaurus nevadanus
            - Omphalosaurus wolfi
    - Ichthyopterygia
      - Chaohusaurus spp.
      - Eoichthyosauria
        - Grippidia
          - Parvinatator wapitiensis
          - - Utatsusaurus hataii
            - - Grippia longirostris
              - Gulosaurus helmi
        - - Ichthyosauria

== Literature ==
- Motani, R., Jiang, D.-Y., Chen, G.-B., Tintori, A., Rieppel, O., Ji, C., and Huang J.-D., 2014, "A basal ichthyosauriform with a short snout from the Lower Triassic of China", Nature. doi:10.1038/nature13866
