= Pessopteryx =

Pessopteryx Temporal range: Early Triassic, Olenekian

Scientific classification
- Kingdom: Animalia
- Phylum: Chordata
- Class: Reptilia
- Order: †Ichthyosauria
- Family: †Merriamosauridae
- Genus: †Pessopteryx; Wiman, 1910

Species
- †P. nisseri Wiman, 1910 (type)

Synonyms
- Merriamosaurus hulkei Maisch & Matzke, 2002; Omphalosaurus niesseri (Wiman, 1910); Rotundopteryx hulkei Maisch & Matzke, 2000 non Duckhouse, 1999

Extinct genus of reptiles

Pessopteryx is an extinct genus of ichthyosaur from the Early Triassic (Olenekian) of Svalbard, Norway. The genus originally contained four species, P. nisseri, P. arctica, P. pinguis, and P. minor, which were named in 1910 by Carl Wiman. Only P. nisseri is still considered valid; P. arctica and P. pinguis are considered nomina dubia while P. minor was reassigned to the tenuous genus Isfjordosaurus. Omphalosaurus nisseri, Merriamosaurus hulkei, and Rotundopteryx hulkei are all historical junior synonyms of P. nisseri. In their 2026 publication on omphalosaurid diversity, Sander et al. considered this species to belong to the genus Omphalosaurus (O. nisseri). They regarded the hypodigm as non-diagnostic based on the limited available data.
