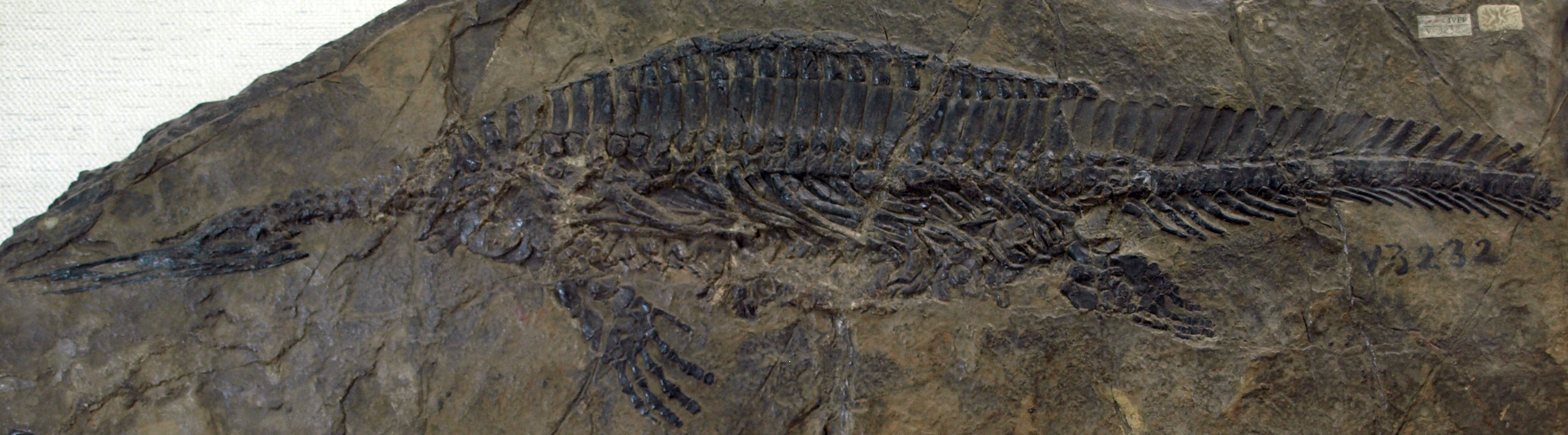
- Hupehsuchus nanchangensis
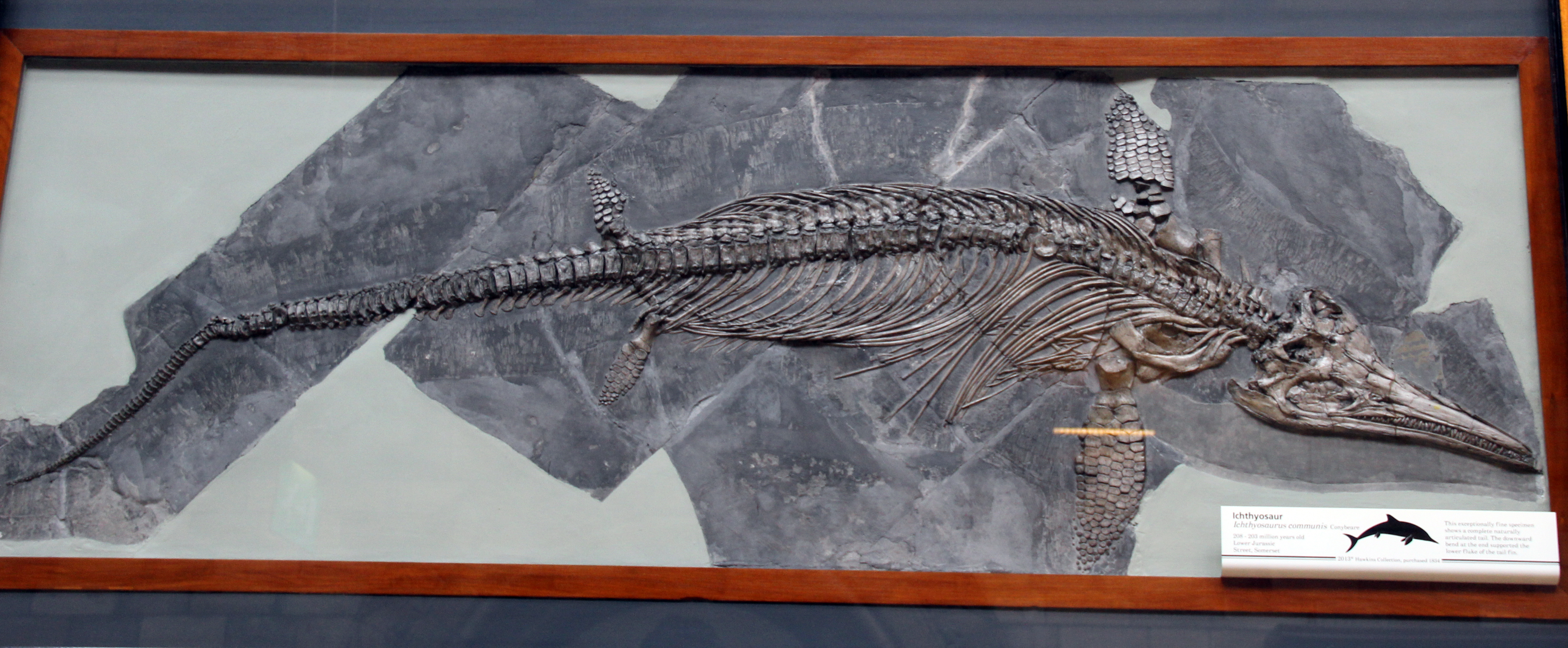
- Ichthyosaurus somersetensis

Scientific classification
- Kingdom: Animalia
- Phylum: Chordata
- Class: Reptilia
- Clade: Neodiapsida
- Clade: †Ichthyosauromorpha; Motani et al., 2014

Subgroups
- †Hupehsuchia; †Ichthyosauriformes

= Ichthyosauromorpha =

Ichthyosauromorpha Temporal range: Early Triassic - Late Cretaceous, 251.3–90 Ma Inferred Permian origins

Clade of marine reptiles

The Ichthyosauromorpha are an extinct clade of Mesozoic marine reptiles consisting of the Ichthyosauriformes and the Hupehsuchia.

The node clade Ichthyosauromorpha was first defined by Ryosuke Motani et al. in 2014 as the group consisting of the last common ancestor of Ichthyosaurus communis and Hupehsuchus nanchangensis, and all its descendants. Their synapomorphies, unique derived traits, include: the presence of an anterior flange on the humerus and radius; the lower end of the ulna being as wide as or wider than the upper end, the forelimb being as long as or longer than the hindlimb, the hand having at least three quarters of the length of the upper arm and lower arm combined, the fibula extending behind the level of the thighbone, and the transverse process of the vertebral neural arch being reduced or absent.

The Ichthyosauromorpha were previously thought to have likely originated in China during the upper Lower Triassic period, about 248 million years ago. However, a 2023 study recorded the fossils of a derived marine ichthyosauromorph (an ichthyopterygian) in earliest Triassic rocks of Spitsbergen, Norway, just 2 million years after the Permian–Triassic extinction event. The presence of such a derived ichthyosauromorph so early in the Triassic indicates that the ichthyosauromorphs (and possibly ichthyosauriformes, depending on divergence estimates) probably originated prior to the end of the Permian and were thus survivors of the mass extinction as opposed to ecological successors that evolved following it.

== Classification ==
Ichthyosauromorpha comprises two clades: the unusual, early-diverging Hupehsuchia, and the more diverse and speciose Ichthyosauriformes. The latter is divided into the early-diverging Omphalosauridae as well as the Ichthyopterygia, which contains the Ichthyosauria and allies. The last ichthyosaurs probably became extinct in the middle Cretaceous. The general relationships of these clades are shown in the cladogram below, based on the results of Sander et al. (2026):

- †Ichthyosauromorpha
  - Hupehsuchia
    - Nanchangosaurus suni
    - - Eohupehsuchus brevicollis
      - - Hupehsuchus nanchangensis
        - - Eretmorhipis carrolldongi
          - Parahupehsuchus longus
  - Ichthyosauriformes
    - Omphalosauridae
      - Cartorhynchus lenticarpus
      - - Ammonitritor scientiacivium
        - - Sclerocormus parviceps
          - Omphalosaurus nisseri
          - - Omphalosaurus nevadanus
            - Omphalosaurus wolfi
    - Ichthyopterygia
      - Chaohusaurus spp.
      - Eoichthyosauria
        - Grippidia
          - Parvinatator wapitiensis
          - - Utatsusaurus hataii
            - - Grippia longirostris
              - Gulosaurus helmi
        - - Ichthyosauria

The relationships of ichthyosauromorphs with other reptiles are unresolved, due to their highly derived morphology even in their earliest known representatives, though they are usually considered to be diapsids. Ichthyosaur researcher Michael Maisch has alternatively argued that the group (or at least Ichthyosauriformes, as he regards hupehsuchians as unrelated) may have its origins within the primitive, non-diapsid lizard-like reptile group Procolonophoidea. A 2022 study on the early evolution of reptiles classified the Ichthyosauromorpha as basal archosauromorphs, forming a clade with the other marine reptile groups Thalattosauria and Sauropterygia as sister to the rest of the Archosauromorpha. A 2023 study describing the Triassic marine reptile Prosaurosphargis found a similar placement.

Cladogram after Simões et al. 2022:

- Neoreptilia
  - †Procolophonia
  - Neodiapsida
    - †Younginiformes
    - - †Eunotosaurus
      - - †Weigeltisauridae
        - Sauria
          - Lepidosauromorpha
            - Rhynchocephalia (tuatara and their extinct relatives)
            - Squamata (lizards and snakes)
          - Archelosauria
            - Pantestudines (turtles and extinct relatives)
            - Archosauromorpha
              - - †Ichthyosauromorpha
                - - †Sauropterygia
                  - †Thalattosauria
              - - †Protorosauria
                  - †Protorosauridae
                  - - †Tanystropheidae
                    - - †Drepanosauromorpha
                      - †Kuehneosauridae
                - - - †Allokotosauria
                    - †Rhynchosauria
                  - Archosauriformes (crocodiles, birds, and their extinct relatives)
