= Isfjordosaurus =

Isfjordosaurus Temporal range: Early Triassic 248.1–246.7 Ma

Scientific classification
- Domain: Eukaryota
- Kingdom: Animalia
- Phylum: Chordata
- Class: Reptilia
- Superorder: †Ichthyopterygia
- Genus: †Isfjordosaurus; Motani, 1999

Type species
- †Isfjordosaurus minor (Wiman, 1910)

Synonyms
- Pessopteryx minor Wiman, 1910

Extinct genus of reptiles

Isfjordosaurus is an extinct genus of ichthyopterygian marine reptile that lived during the Early Triassic. Fossils have been found on the island of Spitsbergen, part of the Svalbard archipelago off the northern coast of Norway. It was formally described by Ryosuke Motani in 1999 and contains the species Isfjordosaurus minor.

== See also ==
- List of ichthyosaurs
- Timeline of ichthyosaur research
