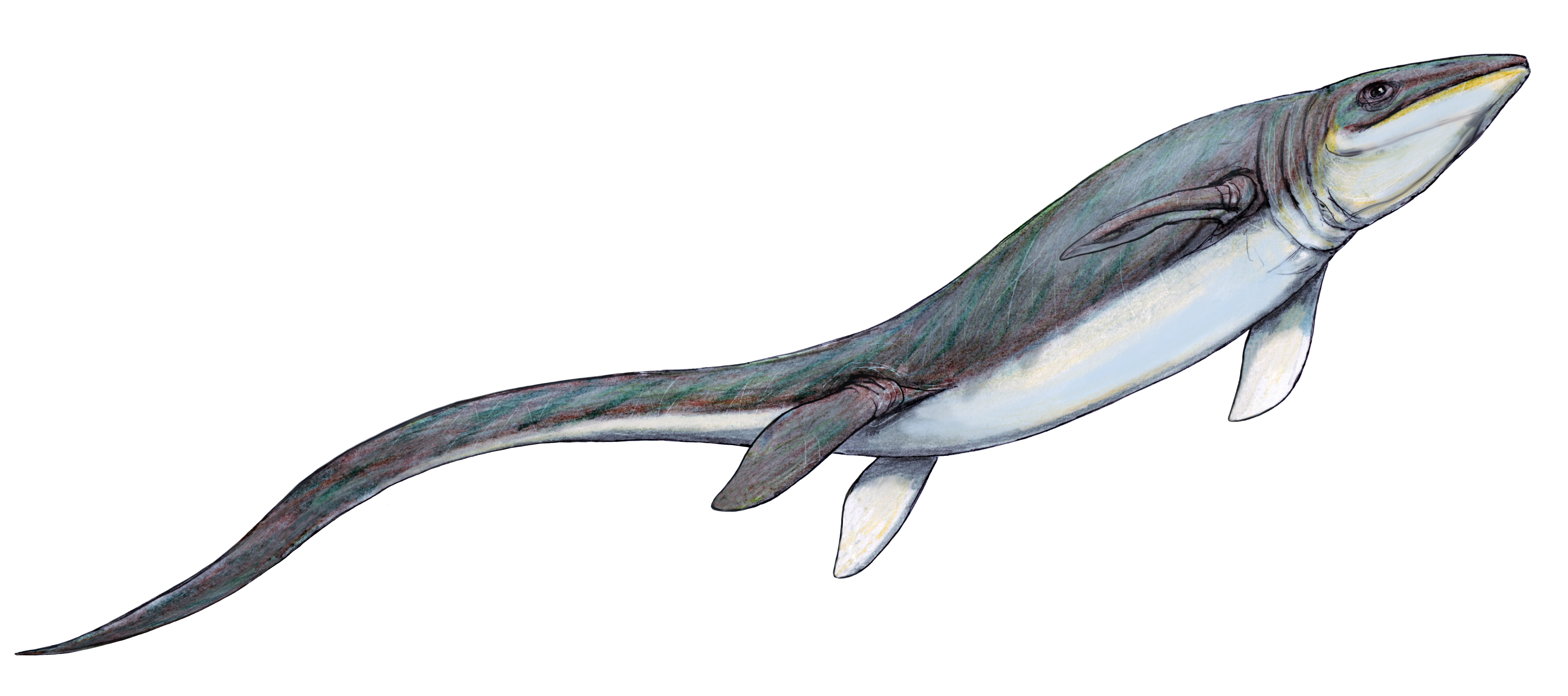
- Life restoration of Omphalosaurus nevadanus

Scientific classification
- Kingdom: Animalia
- Phylum: Chordata
- Class: Reptilia
- Clade: Parapleurota
- Clade: Neodiapsida
- Clade: †Ichthyosauromorpha
- Clade: †Ichthyosauriformes
- Family: †Omphalosauridae; Merriam, 1906

Genera
- †Ammonitritor; †Cartorhynchus; †Omphalosaurus; †Sclerocormus

Synonyms
- Nasorostra Jiang et al., 2016

= Omphalosauridae =

Omphalosauridae Temporal range: Early–Middle Triassic, 252–235 Ma
- Cartorhynchus lenticarpus holotype

Extinct family of reptiles

Omphalosauridae is an extinct family of Ichthyosauriformes that lived during the Early to Middle Triassic of Europe, North America, and Asia. This family currently comprises four genera; Ammonitritor, Cartorhynchus, Omphalosaurus and Sclerocormus.

== Ecology ==
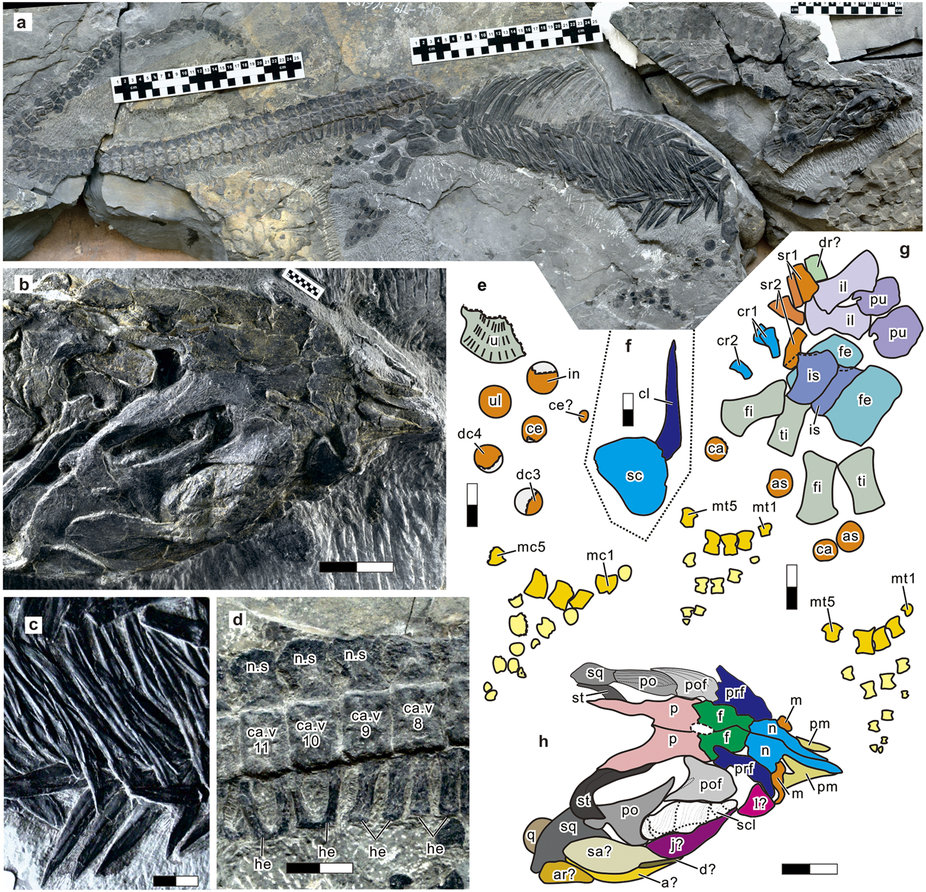
Holotype specimen of Sclerocormus parviceps

Fossils of omphalosaurids have been found in Western North America, Asia (China) and Europe of Svalbard and Bavarian Alps. Members of this family almost always exclusively inhabited open-water habitats. The sole exception is a jaw fossil that has been uncovered from Mid-Triassic shallow marine carbonates of Southern Poland. However, this occurrence is likely a stray carcass not representing a shallow-water member. Nonetheless, they had a wide range, likely due to their unique feeding behavior.

They may have potentially played an important role in the recovery of ecosystems after the End-Permian mass extinction. They were apart of the explosive radiation event of reptiles into the ocean during the Early Triassic during the recovery of pelagic ecosystems after the End-Permian mass extinction. This family, along with early ichthyosauromorph groups, would quickly go extinct at the Early-Middle Triassic boundary. This was likely due to environmental perturbation after the End-Permian extinction, likely involving redox fluctuations, changes in sea levels, and volcanism.

=== Feeding ===
The skull anatomy of omphalosaurids such as Sclerocormus shows unique feeding apparatuses. It is likely that they were durophagous, meaning that they were able to consume hard-shelled and/or exoskeleton-bearing organisms. They likely fed on pelagic invertebrates, especially ammonoids. Omphalosaurids, based on morphofunctional analysis of the jaws, likely occupied the same morphospace of marine turtles, probably with a unique grinding mechanism.

== Taxonomy ==
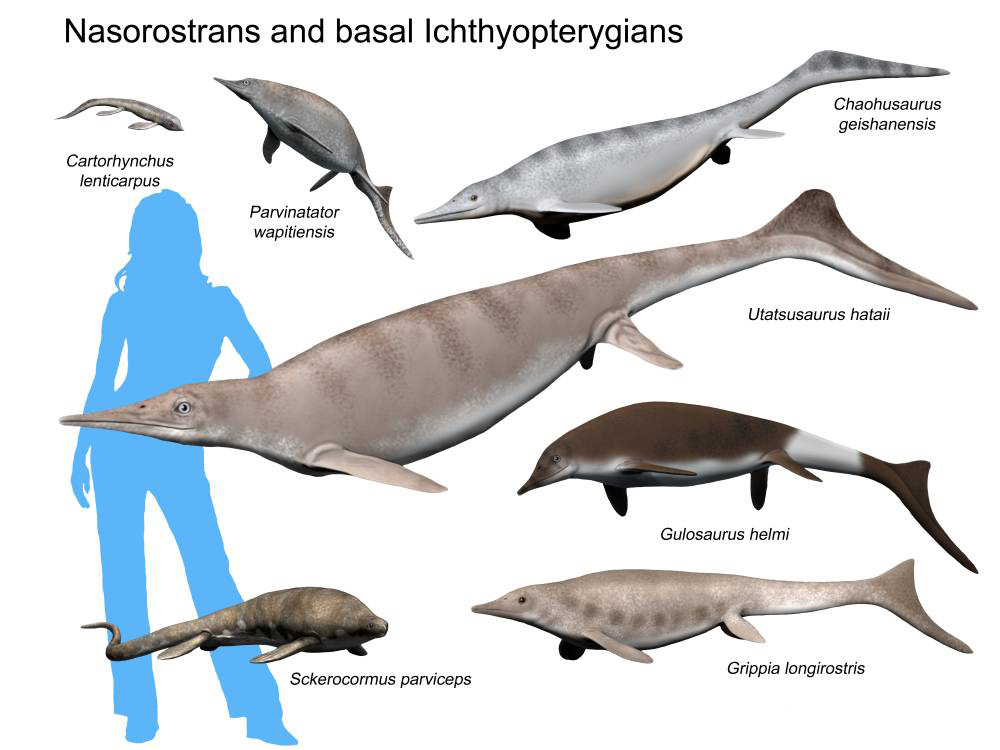
Life restoration of several basal ichthyopterygians including Cartorhynchus (top left) and Sclerocormus (bottom left)

The family was established in 1906 by John Campbell Merriam, an American paleontologist and conservationist. Omphalosaurids have been reported over a century ago but fossils of this group were mostly jaw fragments with few specimens preserving partial cranial and postcranial remains. Due to their fragmentary remains, this family is enigmatic, with its phylogenetic placement being uncertain. Due to this uncertainty, this family has been placed as the closest relatives to rhynchosaurs, placodonts and ichthyosaurs. Modern phylogenetic analysis now unambiguously places omphalosaurids as early diverging ichthyosauriforms.

The clade Nasorostra, erected by Jiang et al. in 2016, is a taxonomic synonym of Omphalosauridae, which had been named first. This clade was named to include Sclerocormus and Cartorhynchus. The synonymy was recognized after the discovery of unrecognized similarities of these Chinese taxa with the European/American Omphalosaurus, placing them together in an early-diverging ichthyosauriform family.

In their 2026 description of Ammonitritor, Sander et al. recovered it as an omphalosaurid, diverging after Cartorhynchus but before Sclerocormus and Omphalosaurus spp. These results are displayed in the cladogram below:

- †Ichthyosauromorpha
  - Hupehsuchia
  - Ichthyosauriformes
    - Omphalosauridae
      - Cartorhynchus lenticarpus
      - - Ammonitritor scientiacivium
        - - Sclerocormus parviceps
          - Omphalosaurus nisseri
          - - Omphalosaurus nevadanus
            - Omphalosaurus wolfi
    - Ichthyopterygia
      - Chaohusaurus spp.
      - Eoichthyosauria
        - Grippidia
        - Ichthyosauria
