= Gulosaurus =

Gulosaurus Temporal range: Early Triassic, 251.3–247.2 Ma

Scientific classification
- Kingdom: Animalia
- Phylum: Chordata
- Class: Reptilia
- Order: †Grippidia
- Family: †Grippiidae
- Genus: †Gulosaurus; Cuthbertson et al., 2013
- Species: †G. helmi

Binomial name
- †Gulosaurus helmi Cuthbertson et al., 2013

Extinct genus of reptiles

Gulosaurus is an extinct genus of basal grippidian ichthyopterygian known from the Early Triassic Vega-Phroso Siltstone Member of the Sulphur Mountain Formation of east-central British Columbia, Canada. Gulosaurus was first named by Robin S. Cuthbertson, Anthony P. Russell and Jason S. Anderson in 2013 and the type species is Gulosaurus helmi. The name means 'Helm's wolverine lizard' and refers to the Wolverine Nordic and Mountain Society, who maintain the area around Wapiti Lake where it was found, and to Dr Charles Helm, who is a leading paleontologist around this same area.

Originally Gulosaurus was thought to be either Grippia longirostris or Parvinatator wapitiensis, but as the fossil was incomplete it was uncertain which. In 2013, the other half of the fossil, including its skull, was discovered and this proved it to be a new species entirely, closely related to Grippia and very similar.

== Features ==
Overall, Gulosaurus was similar to Grippia. It was the same size, around 1.5 meters long, and much of the skeleton was the same, namely the ribs and centrum discovered. Also like Grippia, it had pentadactyl limbs rather than exhibiting polyphalangy, as many later ichthyopterygians did. Most of the flipper structure was very similar apart from the first metacarpal, which had a notched peripheral shaft in Gulosaurus but was lunate in Grippia. The skull of Gulosaurus was also very different to that of Grippia - it had cylindrical anterior teeth, although as no Grippia snouts have been discovered, it remains unknown if this was different. The skull also exhibited postfrontal-frontal contact at the rostral limit of the anterior margin of the supratemporal terrace.

== Phylogeny ==
Below is a cladogram modified from Cuthbertson et al., 2013.

- Ichthyopterygia
  - - Parvinatator wapitiensis
    - Utatsusaurus hataii
  - - Xinminosaurus catactes
    - Eoichthyosauria
      - Grippidia
        - Grippia longirostris
        - Gulosaurus helmi
      - Ichthyosauria sensu Motani (1999)
        - Chaohusaurus geishanensis
        - - Cymbospondylus
          - - Mixosauria
              - Mixosaurus cornalianus
              - Phalarodon atavus
            - - Toretocnemidae
                - Qianichthyosaurus zhoui
                - Toretocnemus californicus
              - - Shastasauria
                  - Shonisaurus popularis
                  - - Shastasaurus pacificus
                    - Callawayia neoscapularis
                - - Guizhouichthyosaurus tangae
                  - - Besanosaurus leptorhynchus
                    - - Californosaurus perrini
                      - Parvipelvia

== See also ==
- List of ichthyosaurs
- Timeline of ichthyosaur research
