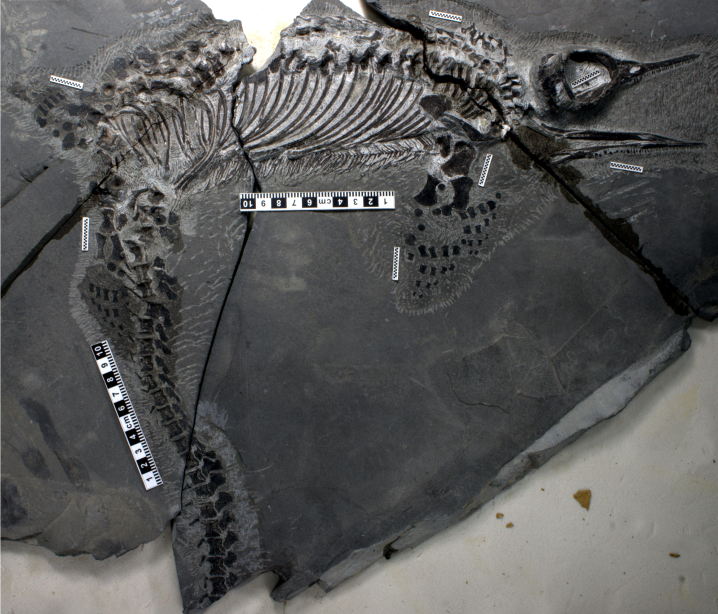
- Specimen AGM CHS-5

Scientific classification
- Kingdom: Animalia
- Phylum: Chordata
- Class: Reptilia
- Superorder: †Ichthyopterygia
- Genus: †Chaohusaurus; Young & Dong, 1972

Type species
- †Chaohusaurus geishanensis Young & Dong, 1972

Species
- †C. geishanensis Young & Dong, 1972; †C. chaoxianensis Chen, 1985; †C. zhangjiawanensis Chen et al., 2013; †C. brevifemoralis Huang et al., 2019

= Chaohusaurus =

Chaohusaurus Temporal range: Early Triassic, 251.3–247.2 Ma

Extinct genus of reptiles

Chaohusaurus is an extinct genus of basal ichthyosauriform from the Early Triassic of Chaohu and Yuan'an, China.

== Discovery and naming ==
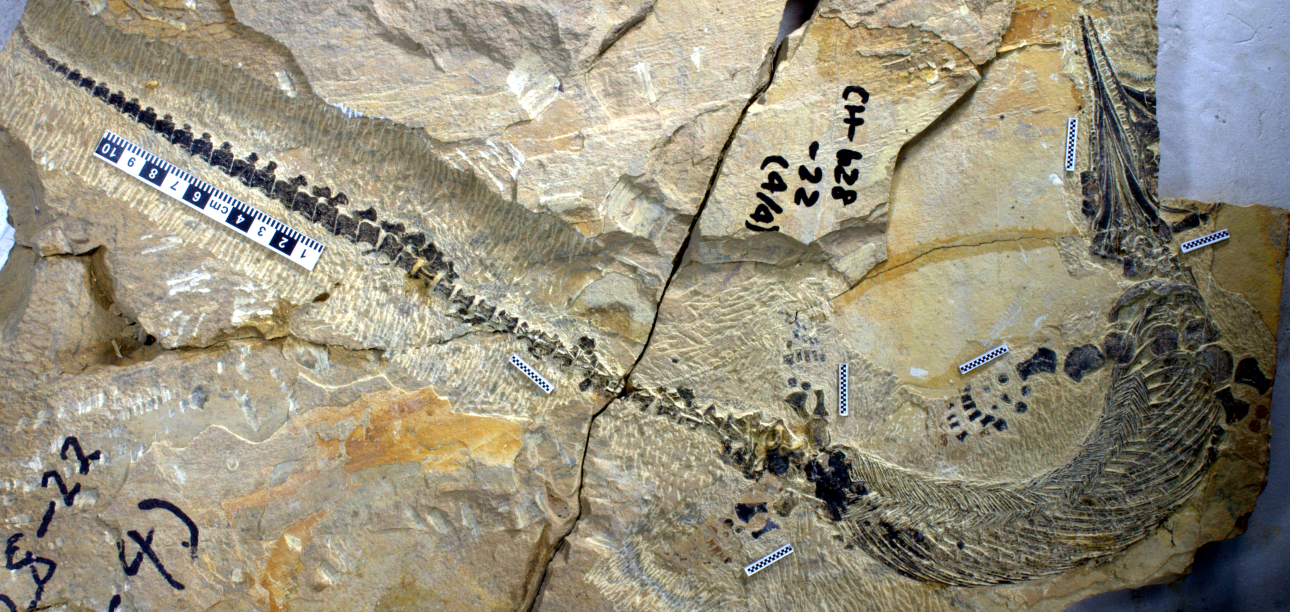
Specimen AGM CH-628-22

The type species Chaohusaurus geishanensis was named and described by Yang Zhongjian and Dong Zhiming in 1972, based on a fossil found during the construction of a railway. The generic name refers to lake Chao Hu. The specific name refers to the Geishan location. The holotype, IVPP V 4001, was uncovered in a layer of the Majianshan Limestone Formation dating from the Anisian. It consists of a partial skeleton, containing the skull and the front torso. In 1985 Chen Lizhu named two additional species based on fossils found in the same formation: Anhuisaurus chaoxianensis and Anhuisaurus faciles. However, the generic name had already been preoccupied by the lizard Anhuisaurus Hou 1974. Therefore, Anhuisaurus Chen 1985 was in 1991 renamed into Chensaurus by Jean-Michel Mazin e.a. In 1998, Ryosuke Motani and Hailu You established that the Chensaurus fossils represented remains of juveniles, with those of C. faciles being the youngest, and that these formed a growth series with Chaohusaurus. This implied that the known material of Chaohusaurus was increased with the specimens AGM P45-H85-25, the holotype of Chensaurus chaoxianensis; AGM P45-H85-20, the holotype of Chensaurus faciles; and the front flippers IVPP V 11361 and IVPP V 11362. In 2001 a detailed description of the osteology of Chaohusaurus was published by Michael Maisch.

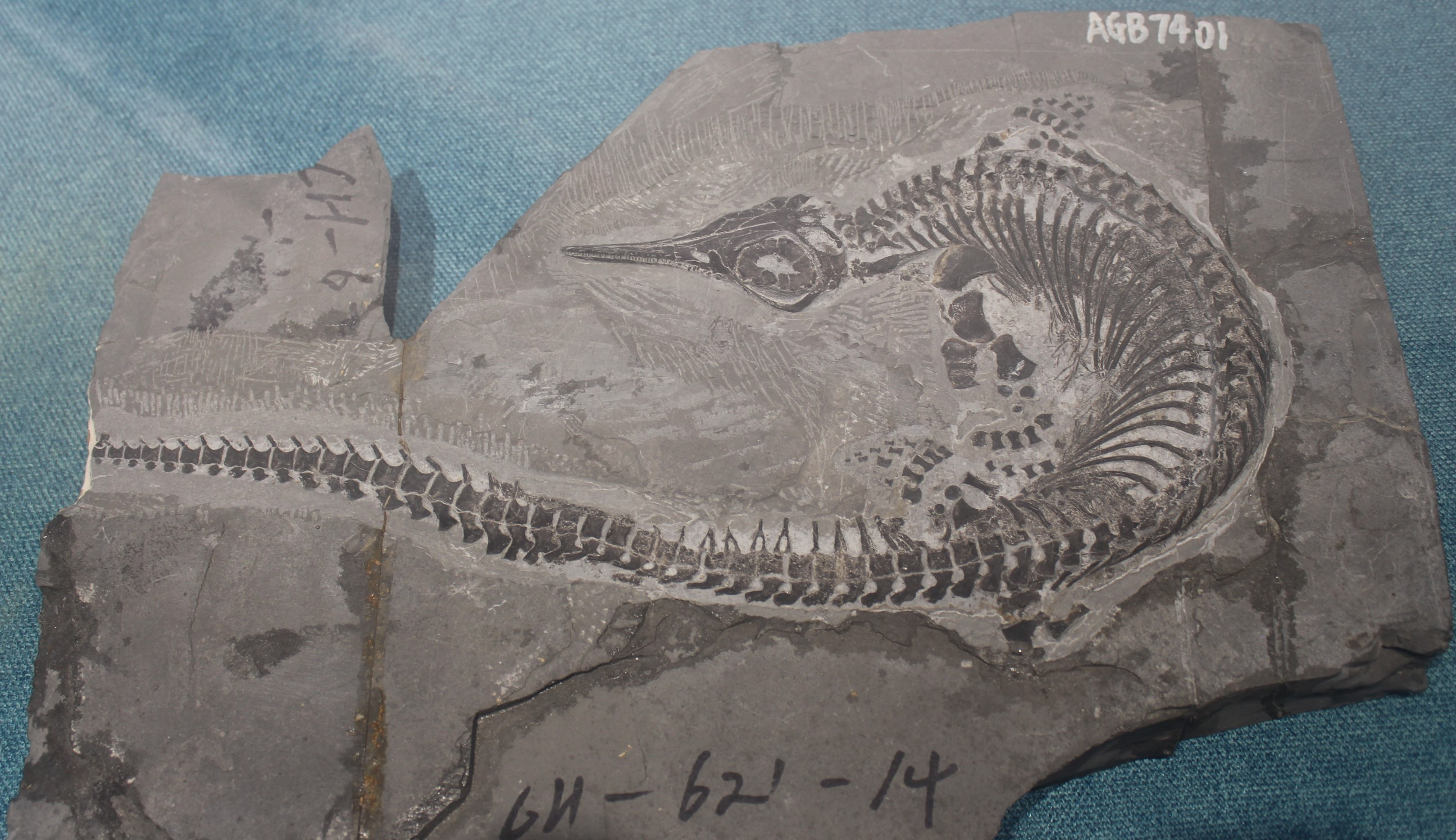
Holotype specimen (AGB7401) of C. brevifemoralis, Geological Museum of China

In 2014, three additional specimens were reported: AGM I-1, AGM CHS-5, and AGM CH-628-22. AGM I-1 also contains the remains of three embryos. These finds are part of discoveries by a Chinese-Italian paleontological project of eighty Chaohusaurus fossils.

In 2013, a second species was named and described by Chen Xiaohong e.a.: Chaohusaurus zhangjiawanensis. The specific name refers to its provenance near the village of Zhangjiawan. The holotype, WHGMR V26001, was uncovered in a layer of the Jialingjang Formation dating from the Spathian. It consists of a relatively complete skeleton with skull. A second skeleton lacking the skull, WHGMR V26002, was referred.

In 2015, Ryosuke Motani and his colleagues reported a large adult forelimb specimen that resembles the immature specimens of C. chaoxianensis, and argued that C. chaoxianensis is not the juvenile of C. geishanensis and is indeed a valid species within the genus Chaohusaurus.

== Description ==
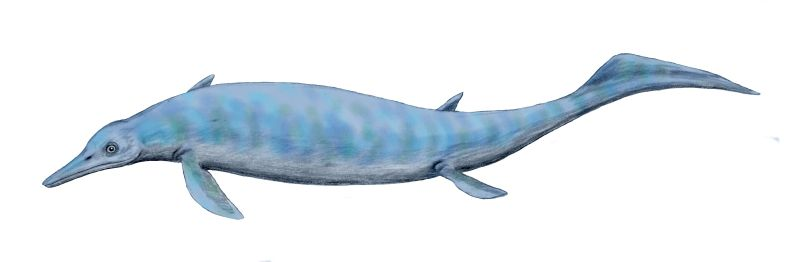
Life restoration of C. geishanensis.

Chaohusaurus is a basal ichthyopterygian. It thus shows traits that are typical for the direct ancestors of ichthyosaurs. As a result, basal ichthyosaurs like Cymbospondylus and Mixosaurus are closer in build to Chaohusaurus while later genera like Ichthyosaurus have a more derived morphology. Chaohusaurus did not have the dolphin-like form of later ichthyosaurs; it had a more lizard-like appearance with an elongated body. These proportions were not caused by a large number of vertebrae, the total of presacrals being about forty, but by an elongated build of each individual vertebra. The head is short, in adults having about the third the length of the trunk, with a narrow pointed beak and large eye-sockets. Its teeth are conspicuously heterodont, differing in shape: those of the upper jaws are pointed though blunt; those of the rear lower jaws are bulbous with a convex profile, a possible adaptation to a durophagous diet, crushing shellfish. The neck is relatively long. Chaohusaurus did have flippers, rather than webbed feet. The tail fin is wide-based in side-view and short.

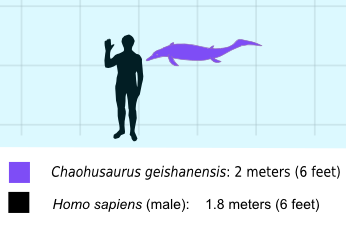
C. geishanensis with a human to scale.

Chaohusaurus is one of the smallest known ichthyopterygians, measuring about 0.7–1 m (2.3–3.3 ft) long and weighing 1.3–3.1 kg (2.9–6.8 lb).

Being a basal ichthyopterygian, Chaohusaurus provides important information about the early evolution of the group. It shows that some typical ichthyosaurian traits were probably already part of the original ichthyopterygian Bauplan. It furthermore has a mix of basal traits that were subsequently lost, early derived traits indicating the genus is not the basalmost ichthyopterygian known and some autapomorphies of its own.

An original ichthyopterygian trait is the fact that the skull roof is short and wide. The basisphenoid at the rear lower end of the braincase is not fused with the basioccipital, the lower bone of the rear skull. The parasphenoid at the front of the braincase has a long cultriform process. There is no separate ectopterygoid present. The lower jaw has a retroarticular process at its rear.

A conspicuous basal trait is the shortness of the head; in later forms it would be longer relative to the trunk. Also the snout is relatively short, only about twice as long as the part behind the eye-socket. The nasals do not reach further backwards than the eye-sockets. The suture between the nasal bone and the frontal is transversely oriented. From the prefrontal a flange overhangs the upper front edge of the eye-socket, perhaps to protect the eyes. The frontal is part of the top edge of the eye-socket and thus lacks a lateral buttress. The frontal is about as large as the parietal. In top view the rear edge of the skull roof is notched. The parietal eye (or at least the foramen parietale) is located between the parietals, not (partly) between the frontals as with later forms. The squamosal is a large element, as large as the quadratojugal with which it is firmly fused. The basisphenoid is narrow. The cultriform process of the parasphenoid at the rear gradually merges with the main body, not via a narrow waist as with later forms. The palate was not firmly attached to the basipterygoid, allowing the snout some vertical movement relative to the remainder of the skull. In most ichthyosaurs no such movement was possible. The opening between the pterygoids was narrow and slit-like, not wide. The pterygoids do not cover the rear underside of the braincase. The neck is relatively long. The tail is elongated, about as long as the head, neck and trunk combined. The vertebrae of the tail base are elongated also, about as long as they are tall. The longest tail spines are located rather to the front indicating that a possible tail fin must have been more horizontal than with later forms. The clavicles have a wide inner flange. The scapula is short, wider than long. The humerus still has a distinct head but not yet a dorsal trochanter. At its lower end, the humerus has a larger facet contacting the radius than contacting the ulna. The upper end of the ulna is narrower than the lower end, not equal in size to it. In general the bones of the lower arm, including the hand bones, are rather elongated, not transformed into discs. The ulna and radius still have a shaft as with land animals. In the wrist the pisiform is about as large as the ulnar carpal, not much smaller or absent. The fifth metacarpal has a convex rear edge and is longer than the fourth distal carpal. There are still five fingers present, without a reduction of the first finger. Polydactyly, an extra number of fingers, is thus lacking. Hyperphalangy, supernumerary phalanges, is likewise absent. The phalanx formula is 2-3-4-4-2. The upper phalanges are relatively elongated, longer than wide. The lower phalanges still show ossification below the cartilage perichondrium and have notches in their edges. The pubic bone is perforated by a foramen obturatum, which closed in side view and located some distance from the rear edge of the body. The hindfin is about as large as the forefin, not smaller. In the thighbone, the facet contacting the tibia is as large and as far reaching downwards as the facet contacting the fibula. Between the tibia and fibula still a space is present, and both bones, though flattened are relatively elongated with a clear shaft. The same is true for the metatarsals, that are cylinder-shaped. There are still five toes present, again rather elongated and hourglass-shaped.

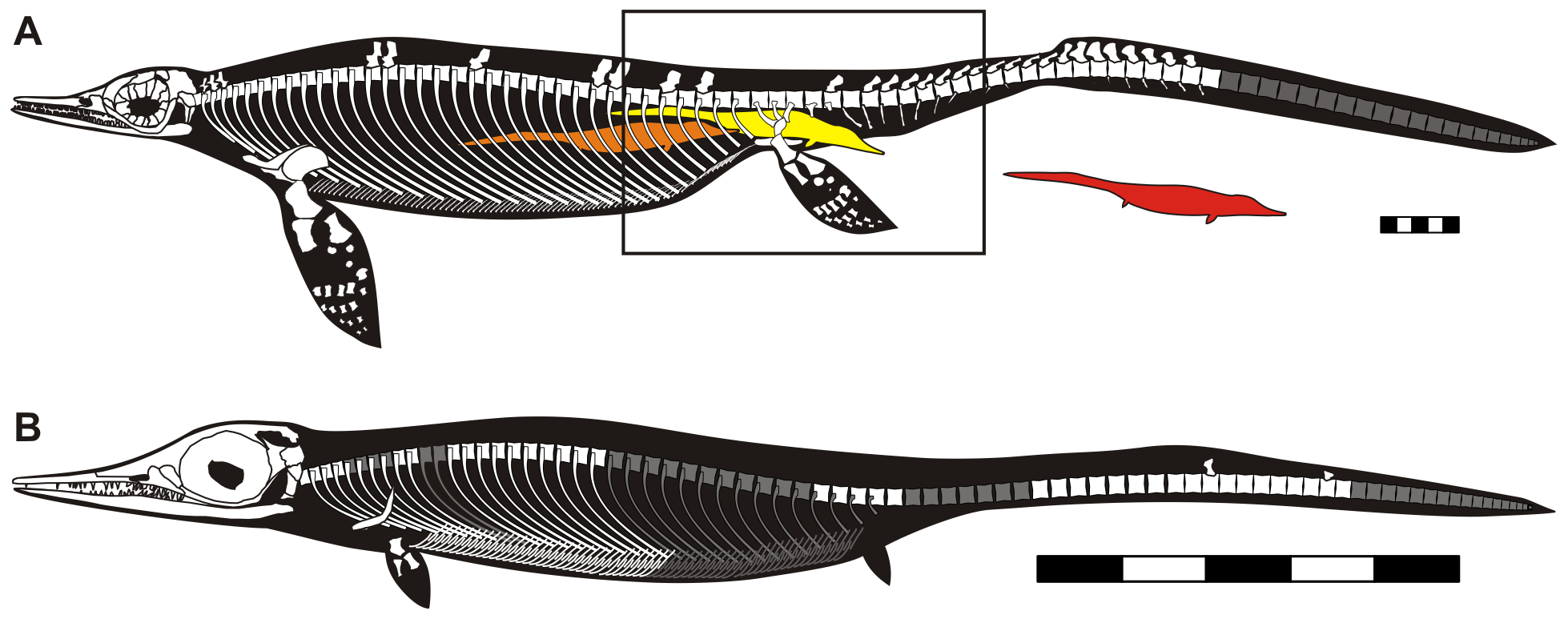
Skeletal restoration of adult (A) and juvenile (B)

An early derived trait is the relative shortness of the spines of the tail. The humerus has a flange at the front edge but it is not secondarily reduced. The flange has a small notch. The fifth metatarsal is shortened and the first is even shorter. The fifth toe is shorter than the first toe.

In Chaohusaurus the width of basisphenoid is about 63% of its length. Chaohusaurus has a combination of more pointed and bulbous teeth, that was probably separately evolved.

The second species, Chaohusaurus zhangjiawanensis, has some distinguishing traits. The skull is rather flat. The trunk vertebrae have well-developed transversal processes. The prefrontal touches the postfrontal, excluding the frontal from the rim of the eye-socket, a derived trait. The calcaneum is larger. The first sacral rib has an expanded outer end. The second sacral rib has a tapered end.

== Classification ==
Chaohusaurus was in the original description of 1972 assigned to the Omphalosauridae. Both the 1999 phylogenetic analysis of Motani and the 2000 analysis of Maisch and Matzke found Chaohusaurus to by the sister taxon of Grippia, the two genera united in a group named Grippidia or Grippiidae. In Motani's study, Chaohusaurus was classified as a non-ichthyosaurian ichthyopterygian, while Maisch and Matzke, who used a more inclusive definition of Ichthyosauria, considered it to be a basal ichthyosaur.

The cladogram below follows Maisch and Matzke, 2000.

- Ichthyosauria
  - Thaisaurus
  - - Utatsusaurus
    - - Grippiidae
        - Chaohusaurus
        - Grippia
      - - Parvinatator
        - Hueneosauria
          - - Wimanius
            - Mixosauridae
          - Longipinnati
            - Toretocnemidae
            - - Cymbospondylidae
              - Merriamosauria

A cladistic analysis published by Chen and colleagues in the 2013 description of Chaohusaurus zhangjiawanensis did not find this taxon to be the sister species of Chaohusaurus geishanensis which was more closely related to Grippia. Even though this would make the genus paraphyletic, C. zhangjiawanensis was nevertheless placed in Chaohusaurus because of the morphological similarity to the type species. The authors did not place the genus in a family, instead listing it as incertae sedis.

The analysis of Motani and colleagues in 2015 found Chaohusaurus to be basal to all other ichthyopterygians. Subsequent analyses have also supported such a placement. Ji and colleagues attributed this change in phylogenetic position to a greater understanding of Chaohusaurus anatomy and additional specimens. While sometimes still classified within Ichthyopterygia, Moon noted that as this group was not redefined to account for this newer topology, Chaohusaurus technically falls outside of it.

The cladogram below follows Huang and colleagues, 2019.

- Ichthyosauromorpha
  - Hupehsuchia
  - Ichthyosauriformes
    - Nasorostra
    - - - Chaohusaurus geishanensis
        - Chaohusaurus zhangjiawanensis
        - - Chaohusaurus chaoxianensis
          - Chaohusaurus brevifemoralis
      - Ichthyopterygia
        - Grippidia
          - Parvinatator
          - - Utatsusaurus
            - - Grippia
              - Gulosaurus
        - Ichthyosauria

== Reproduction ==
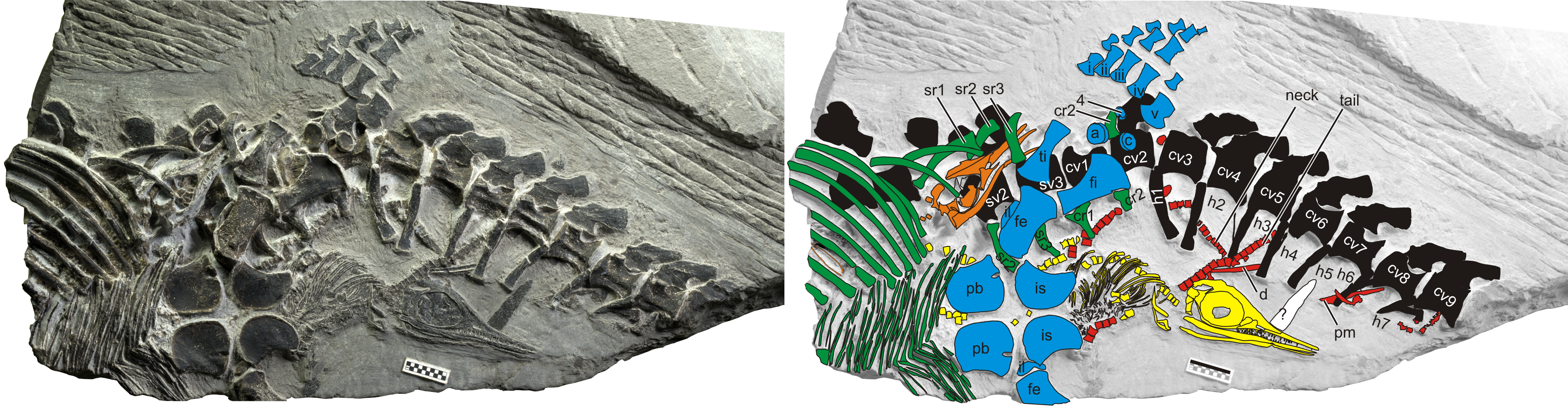
Specimen AGM I-1 with three juveniles

One specimen among those reported in 2014, AGM I-1, also contained the remains of two embryos and one neonate. Chaohusaurus thus birthed its young viviparously in the water, like later ichthyosaurs. However, from the orientation of both the embryos inside the maternal body and the neonate that had already been giving birth to, it was clear that the young exited the birth canal head-first. This differs from the method used by most extant marine viviparous Amniota, which expel the young tail-first to prevent them from suffocating. Many younger ichthyosaur specimens had earlier been found showing embryos in both positions, leaving it undecided which was the normal one. Motani et alii (2014) concluded that, because Chaohusaurus is a very basal form, this provided strong evidence that, at least originally, ichthyopterygian young were born with the head first. This early method might have later been changed because it resulted in a too high mortality. They also cited this as evidence for a terrestrial evolution of viviparity in the land-dwelling ancestors of ichthyosaurs. AGM I-1 in 2014 represented the oldest reptile viviparous birth known.

== Palaeoecology ==
C. geishanensis was most likely a nearshore specialist that only occasionally wandered out into deep water environments.

== See also ==
- List of ichthyosaurs
- Timeline of ichthyosaur research
