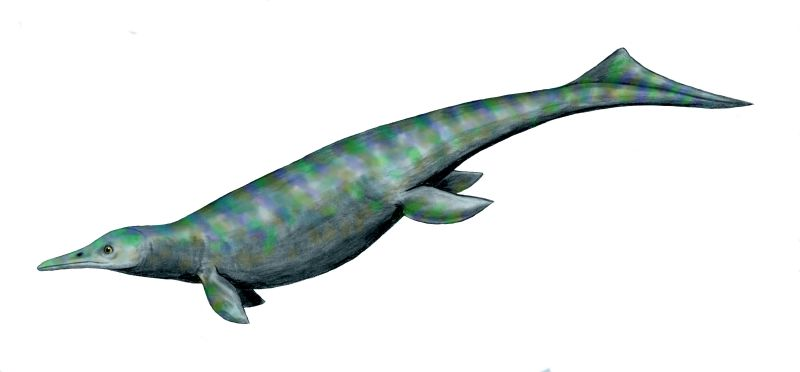
- Utatsusaurus

Scientific classification
- Kingdom: Animalia
- Phylum: Chordata
- Class: Reptilia
- Clade: †Ichthyosauriformes
- Superorder: †Ichthyopterygia; Owen, 1840

Subgroups
- †Isfjordosaurus?; †Parvinatator; †Thaisaurus; †Utatsusaurus; †Eoichthyosauria; †Grippidia; †Grippia; †Gulosaurus; †Ichthyosauria

= Ichthyopterygia =

Ichthyopterygians Temporal range: Early Triassic - Late Cretaceous 251.3–90 Ma

Extinct order of reptiles

Ichthyopterygia ("fish flippers") was a designation introduced by Sir Richard Owen in 1840 to designate the Jurassic ichthyosaurs that were known at the time, but the term is now used more often for both true Ichthyosauria and their more primitive early and middle Triassic ancestors.

Basal ichthyopterygians (prior to and ancestral to true Ichthyosauria) were mostly small (a meter or less in length) with elongated bodies and long, spool-shaped vertebrae, indicating that they swam in a sinuous, eel-like manner. This allowed for quick movements and maneuverability that were advantages in shallow-water hunting. Even at this early stage, they were already very specialised animals with proper flippers, and would have been incapable of movement on land.

These animals seem to have been widely distributed around the coast of the northern half of Pangea, as they are known from the Olenekian (Early Triassic) and early Anisian (early Middle Triassic) of Japan, China, Canada, and Spitsbergen (Norway). By the later part of the Middle Triassic, the stem group members were extinct, having been replaced by their descendants, the true ichthyosaurs.

Fossil remains of derived marine ichthyopterygians, and the oldest ichthyopterygian remains to date, are known from the Olenekian aged Vikinghøgda Formation of Spitsbergen (Svalbard). These rocks are dated to just 2 million years after the Permian-Triassic extinction event, indicating that ichthyopterygians at the very least originated very early in the Triassic, before the Late Smithian crisis (a widespread ocean anoxic event that may have allowed ichthyopterygians to dominate deeper waters and temnospondyls to dominate shallow waters) and that ichthyosauromorphs as a whole originated during the Permian and were survivors of the Permian-Triassic mass extinction.

== Taxonomy ==
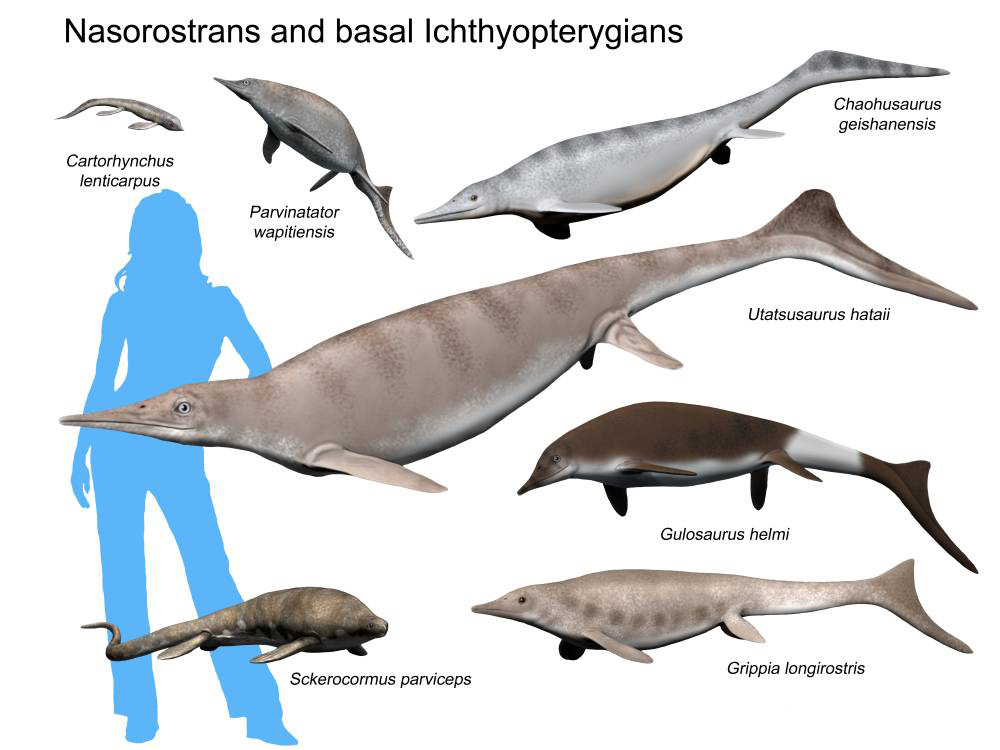
Nasorostrans and basal ichthyopterygians

Below is a cladogram modified from Cuthbertson et al., 2013.

- Ichthyopterygia
  - - Parvinatator wapitiensis
    - Utatsusaurus hataii
  - - Xinminosaurus catactes
    - Eoichthyosauria
      - Grippidia
        - Grippia longirostris
        - Gulosaurus helmi
      - Ichthyosauria sensu Motani (1999)
        - Chaohusaurus geishanensis
        - - Cymbospondylus
          - - Mixosauria
              - Mixosaurus cornalianus
              - Phalarodon atavus
            - - Toretocnemidae
                - Qianichthyosaurus zhoui
                - Toretocnemus californicus
              - - Shastasauria
                  - Shonisaurus popularis
                  - - Shastasaurus pacificus
                    - Callawayia neoscapularis
                - - Guizhouichthyosaurus tangae
                  - - Besanosaurus leptorhynchus
                    - - Californosaurus perrini
                      - Parvipelvia

== General references ==
- Ellis, Richard, (2003) Sea Dragons - Predators of the Prehistoric Oceans. University Press of Kansas
- McGowan, C & Motani, R. (2003) Ichthyopterygia, Handbook of Paleoherpetology, Part 8, Verlag Dr. Friedrich Pfeil
