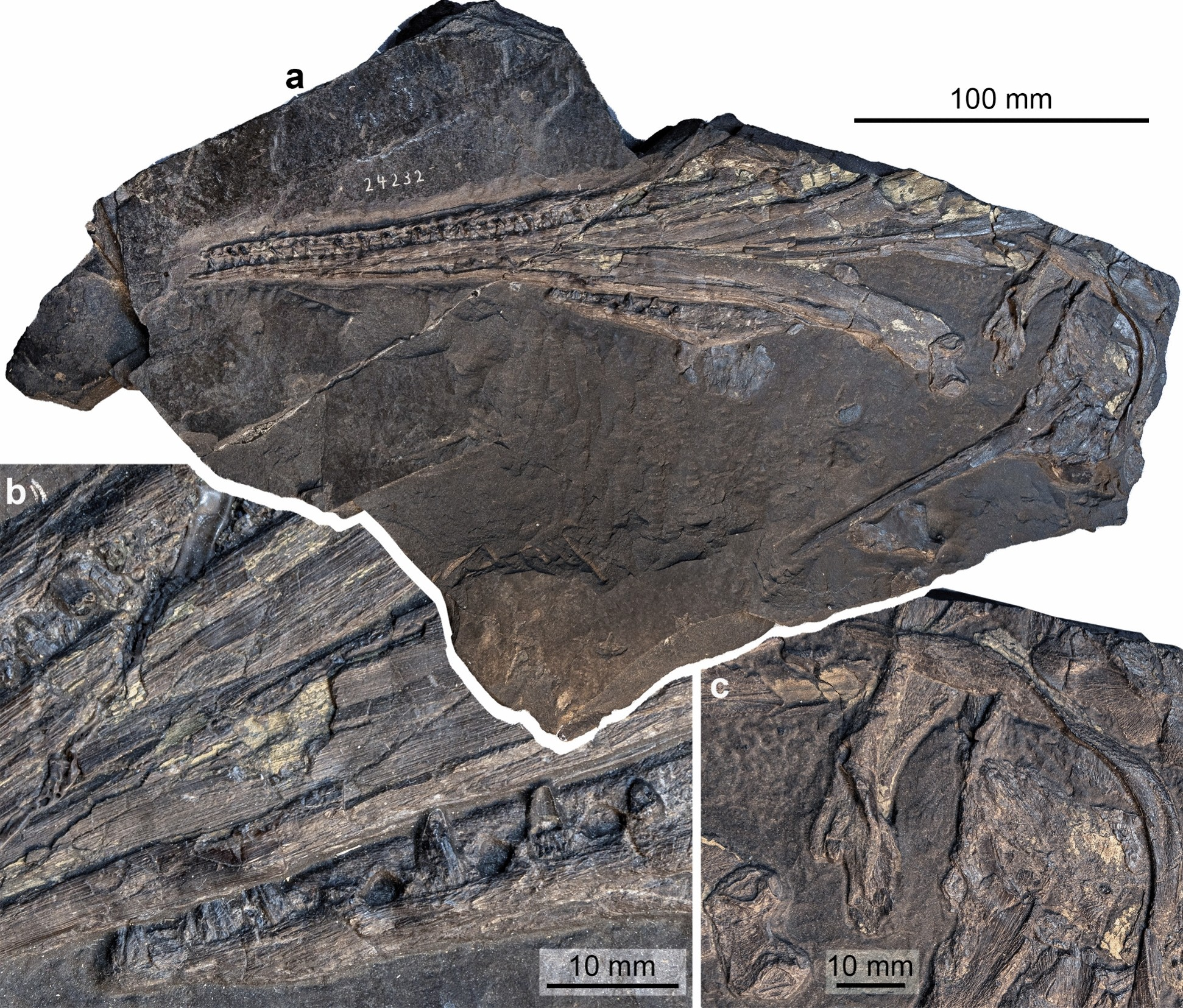
- GPIT-PV-76272, the holotype specimen, with close-ups of the teeth (lower left) and back of the skull (lower right)

Scientific classification
- Kingdom: Animalia
- Phylum: Chordata
- Class: Reptilia
- Order: †Ichthyosauria
- Node: †Hueneosauria
- Family: †Wimaniidae; Maisch, 2010
- Genus: †Wimanius; Maisch & Matzke, 1998
- Species: †W. odontopalatus

Binomial name
- †Wimanius odontopalatus Maisch & Matzke, 1998

= Wimanius =

Wimanius Temporal range: Middle Triassic, late Anisian

Extinct genus of reptiles

Wimanius is a genus of ichthyosaur from the Middle Triassic of Switzerland, containing a single species, Wimanius odontopalatus. It was described by Michael Maisch and Andreas Matzke in 1998 based on an incomplete skull from Monte San Giorgio, a mountain on the Swiss-Italian border. Wimanius possesses teeth on its palate, though whether they were located on the palatine or pterygoid is disputed. Other features of Wimanius include a large orbit and jugals with two rami of similar lengths. Different phylogenetic placements of Wimanius have been recovered by different studies, including it being a mixosaurid relative or a merriamosaur, and a monotypic family, Wimaniidae has been named for it. However, its validity has also been questioned, and synonymy with various other genera has been proposed. The only specimen of Wimanius come from the Besano Formation. During the Anisian, this region was a lagoon populated by a wide variety of marine life, including a variety of other ichthyosaurs.

== Discovery and naming ==
The type and only specimen of Wimanius was first recognized as belonging to a new genus by Michael Maisch and Andreas Matzke while examining Mixosaurus specimens in the Museum für Geologie und Paläontologie der Universität Tübingen. This specimen, now numbered GPIT-PV-76272, formerly GPIT 1797, is a partial, crushed skull, consisting of a well-preserved lower jaw and upper part of the snout in addition to further elements from the temporal region, braincase, palate, region around the orbits, and the very incomplete skull roof. This skull originated from Monte San Giorgio in Switzerland, recovered from the Grenzbitumenzone of the Besano Formation. The specimen was found in the middle part of the Grenzbitumenzone, dating to the late Anisian, near the border between the Anisian and Ladinian stages of the Middle Triassic. The Middle Triassic dolomites and shales of Monte San Giorgio in Italy and Switzerland are rich in fossils and have yielded many marine reptiles, including the ichthyosaurs Besanosaurus, Cymbospondylus, and the especially common Mixosaurus. The genus name Wimanius honors the Swedish paleontologist Carl Wiman, known for his numerous works concerning Triassic ichthyosaurs. The specific name odontopalatus refers to the presence of teeth on the palate, an unusual feature for an ichthyosaur.

== Description ==
The foremost bones in the snout of Wimanius, the premaxillae, are long and thin. Next to the tooth row, each premaxilla is marked with a palatal ridge on its inner surface. The premaxillae would not have extended over the external nares, the openings for the nostrils. Behind the premaxillae are the maxillae, each of which bear only nine teeth. The teeth do not extend below the weakly hooked upwards-projecting processes of the maxillae which form the external nares' back edges. The portions of the maxillae in front of these processes are short and shallow, while those behind them are plate-like and tapering, and bear a ridge marking where the jugal articulated. The nasal bones are mostly narrow but are broad and flat toward their hind ends. They do not seem to have extended very far back on the skull roof. A poorly preserved, curved bone was tentatively identified as a postfrontal by Maisch and Matzke in 1998, but they backtracked on this identification the following year.

The jugal is a thin bone, consisting of two rami of the same length that intersect in a curved, 110-degree angle. While this shape is like that of some leptonectids, no other Triassic ichthyosaur features such a shape. The lower of the two rami bears a ridge along its top and its outer surface is bowed inwards. The other ramus rises vertically and is thick and keeled, with the postorbital probably being located in front of it. Therefore, the rear portion of the orbit would have been formed by the crescentic postorbital. Based on their reconstruction of the skull, Maisch and Matzke found Wimanius to have had very large orbits, proportionally the largest known among Triassic ichthyosaurs at the time, resulting in the back part of the skull being rather tall. However, they considered this possibly the result of the specimen being a juvenile. A circle of bony plates within the orbit known as the scleral ring would have supported the eye; while only two of these plates are known in the holotype, Maisch and Matzke estimated that a complete ring would have 13 or 14 in total based on their reconstructed orbit size. These plates are quite large in Wimanius, which gave the ring a rather small inner diameter.

The portion of the skull behind the orbits is reduced in length, though this again may be due to the specimen being a juvenile. The supratemporals are triradiate bones in this skull region. Two of their processes contributed to the rim of the supratemporal fenestrae, one process large, wide, quadrangular and reaching forwards, the other thin and extending towards the midline. The third, backwards-projecting process is reduced. A probable squamosal is also known, but incomplete and poorly preserved. The quadratojugals are flat, roughly triangular bones in the postorbital region, with more or less straight rear and lower edges and bowed upper edges. Maisch and Matzke considered it probable that the jugal and the front lower portion of the quadratojugal were in contact in life. A distinct, constricted process on the quadratojugal would have articulated with the quadrate, the cranial bone involved in the jaw joint not preserved in the holotype. Based on the quadratojugal's shape, Maisch and Matzke predicted that a large opening would have been present between these two bones in their 1999 reconstruction.

Wimanius possesses palatal teeth, though what bone they are located on is disputed due to the poor preservation of its palatal bones. Maisch and Matzke considered the "flake-like" bone upon which these teeth are situated to be a palatine in their original description, citing the presence of teeth on this bone in Grippia. In 1999, however, Ryosuke Motani argued that the tooth-bearing palatal bone was instead likely the pterygoid as in Utatsusaurus, noting that the supposed palatal teeth of Grippia were instead additional rows of maxillary teeth. Spread over an area about 17 millimetres (0.67 in) long, the palatal teeth are arranged in one or two rows in different regions, and oriented from front to back. The most complete of these teeth is only about 1 millimetre (0.039 in) tall, with a smooth-sided conical crown and a coarse root.

The bone Maisch and Matzke identified as a pterygoid has a straight inner edge, indicating that the pterygoids would have enclosed little space between each other when articulated. This bone possesses a robust process on the outer side interpreted as articulating with the quadrate, and a prominent backwards projection on its inner side, the posteromedial process. Wimanius has a quadrangular supraoccipital, a midline braincase bone, which forms the top part of the opening of the foramen magnum, semicircular in this taxon. The otic capsules would have been attached to the supraoccipital on well-developed facets. Maisch and Matzke tentatively identified a small, flat, and narrow bone as a stapes. Unusually, this bone has a forked end, more typical of a temnospondyl than an ichthyosaur, though such a morphology has been reported in Phalarodon.

The lower jaw of Wimanius measures around 25 centimetres (9.8 in) in the holotype, indicating that the animal was probably rather small. The dentaries reach as far back along the lower jaw as the level of the coronoid processes. Wimanius has a low eminence situated on the surangular in front of the jaw joint, the surangulars being long and reinforced rear mandibular bones. The surangulars are upcurved and located directly above the angulars. The teeth of Wimanius are all straight and cone-shaped, with each tooth being set into a distinct socket. The tooth crowns bear vertical striations, which are more strongly pronounced at their bases than at the tips, but lack cutting edges. This ornamentation is less pronounced on the known lower teeth than the upper teeth. In both jaws, tooth size is smaller at the front and larger at the back.

== Classification and validity ==
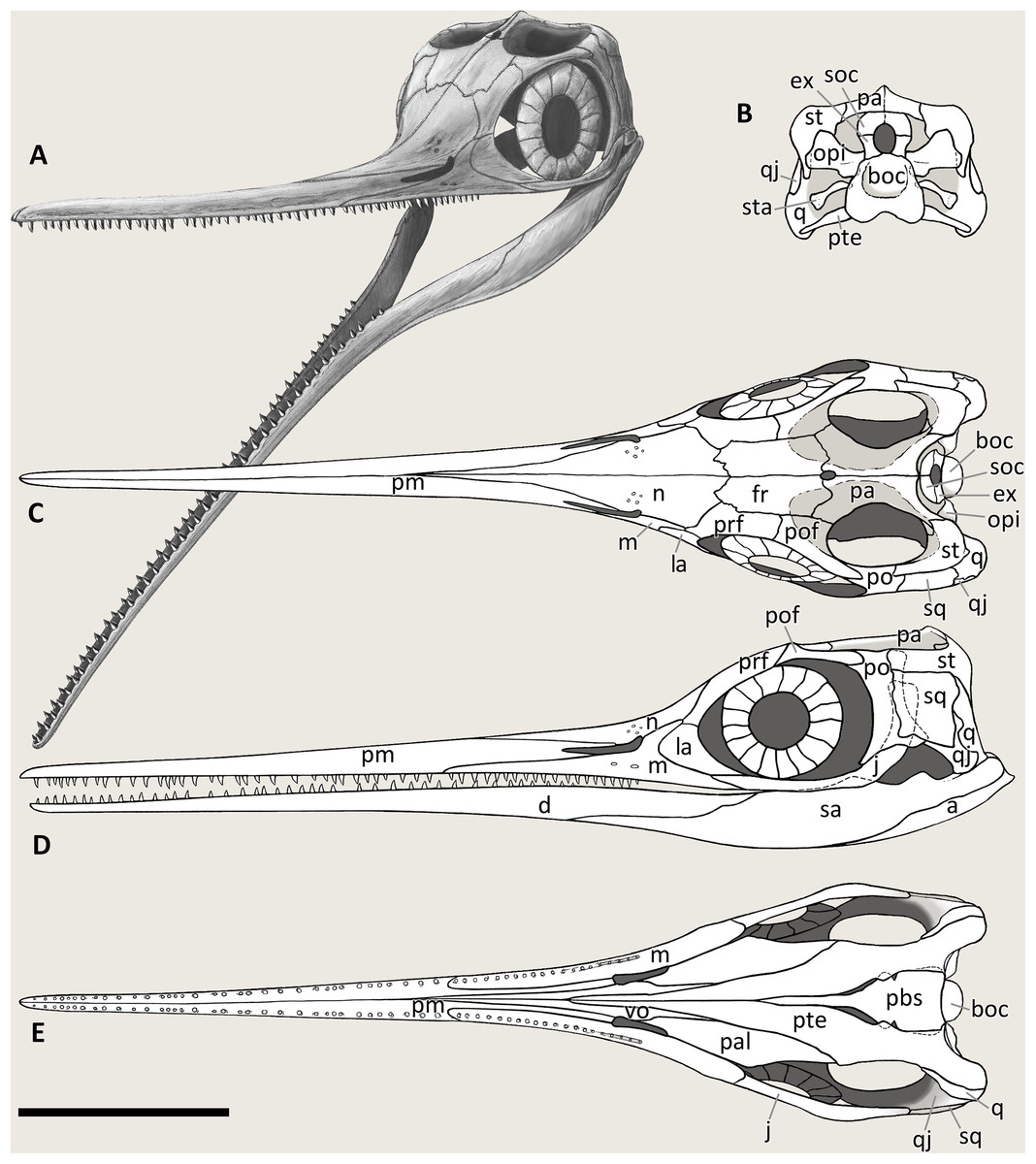
Reconstructed skull of Besanosaurus, a genus that Wimanius has been proposed to be a synonym of

In their 1998 paper naming Wimanius, Maisch and Matzke noted that the fragmentary nature of the only known specimen made it difficult to determine how to classify it with much confidence. They noted that it did not seem to closely resemble either mixosaurids or shastasaurids, though they considered it to be more closely related to the latter group, and, by extension, ichthyosaurs from the Jurassic and Cretaceous. However, in the following year, the same authors restudied the skull and found it to more closely resemble a mixosaurid; therefore they proposed it to potentially be closely related to that group instead. However, they also considered it possible that Wimanius branched off earlier in ichthyosaur evolution. They compared it to Mikadocephalus, another ichthyosaur from Monte San Giorgio, and considered the two to be very different in a variety of features.

In 1999, Motani classified Wimanius as Ichthyosauria incertae sedis. Additionally, he noted that while Wimanius and Mikadocephalus did differ in some aspects, they were quite similar in others, therefore arguging that further study was needed before the distinctiveness of Wimanius could be confirmed. In 2000, Paul Martin Sander also expressed doubt over whether Wimanius was valid and stated that further study would be needed on the ichthyosaurs of the region to determine this. In addition to noting its similarity to Mikadocephalus, he also argued that Mikadocephalus was probably synonymous with Besanosaurus. Sander classified Wimanius as a shastasaurid and considered it possible that it represented a juvenile Besanosaurus. However, Maisch and Matzke considered Wimanius to be a valid, diagnosable taxon in 2000, including it in their phylogenetic analysis and finding it to be the sister taxon of Mixosauridae.

In a 2003 book with Christopher McGowan, Motani considered that both Wimanius and Mikadocephalus might be junior synonyms of the taxonomically problematic Pessosaurus. However, as he had not personally observered the relevant specimens he refrained from formally synonymizing the taxa, instead listing them as species inquirendae. In 2010, Maisch named a new monotypic family, Wimaniidae, using the name Mixosauria for the group consisting of it and mixosaurids. Noting the distance between Wimanius and Mikadocephalus in this classification, he reiterated his argument that Wimanius was a distinct genus from Mikadocephalus, considering the evidence for this synonymy to be lacking. The phylogenetic analyses of Ben Moon in 2017 found a different placement for Wimanius, among the more derived group Merriamosauria. Wimanius was listed as a shastasaurid by Judith M. Pardo-Pérez and colleagues in 2020 and treated as potentially invalid by Ya-Lei Yin and colleagues in 2021, following McGowan and Motani's 2003 publication. In 2024, in a review detailing ichthyosaurs discovered in Switzerland, Christian Klug and colleagues maintain Wimanius as a distinct and valid ichthyosaur taxon pending re-evaluation.

Cladogram following Maisch and Matzke, 2000.

- - Parvinatator
  - Hueneosauria
    - - Wimanius
      - Mixosauridae
    - Longipinnati
      - Toretocnemidae
      - - Cymbospondylidae
        - Merriamosauria
          - Besanosaurus
          - - Shastasaurus
            - - Shonisaurus
              - - Mikadocephalus
                - - Californosaurus
                  - - Callawayia
                    - Parvipelvia

Cladogram following the preferred tree of Moon, 2017.

- Ichthyosauria
  - Parvinatator wapitiensis
  - Thalattoarchon saurophagis
  - Xinminosaurus catactes
  - Mixosauridae
  - - Pessopteryx nisseri
    - Cymbospondylus spp.
    - - Phantomosaurus neubigi
      - Merriamosauria
        - Besanosaurus leptorhynchus
        - Californosaurus perrini
        - Phalarodon major
        - Qianichthyosaurus xingyiensis
        - Wimanius odontopalatus
        - Shastasauridae
        - Euichthyosauria

== Paleoecology ==
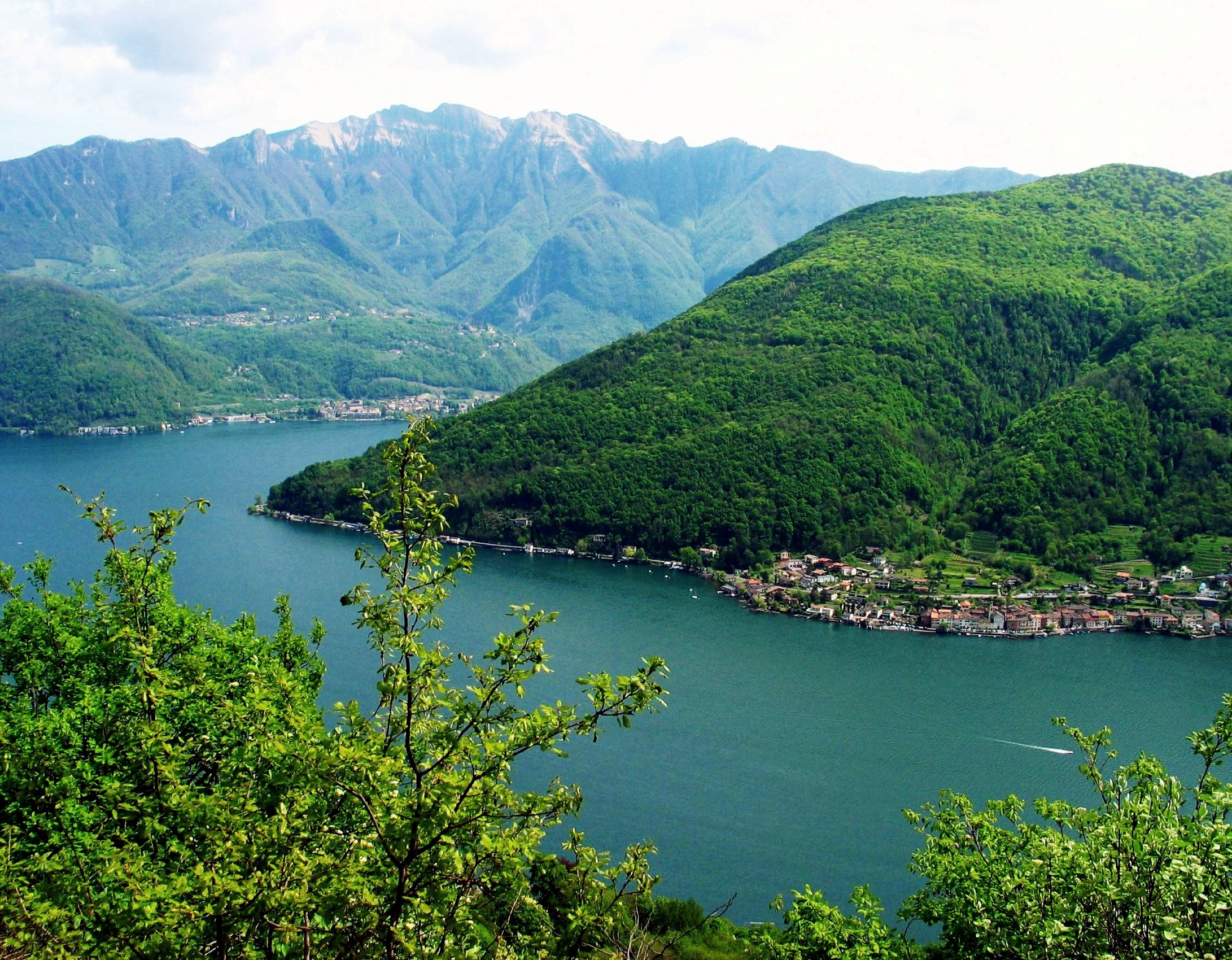
A view of Monte San Giorgio, where Wimanius was found

The only currently known specimen of Wimanius is recorded from the Besano Formation, also known as the Grenzbitumenzone in Switzerland. This formation is located in the Alps and extends from southern Switzerland to northern Italy, containing numerous fossils dating from between the end of the Anisian and the beginning of the Ladinian. This formation is one of a series of Middle Triassic units atop a carbonate platform at Monte San Giorgio, and measures 5–16 metres (16–52 ft) thick. During the time when the animal lived, when the Besano Formation was being deposited, the region where Monte San Giorgio is would have been a marine lagoon, located in a basin on the western side of the Tethys Ocean. Researchers estimate that this same lagoon would have reached between 30–130 metres (98–427 ft) deep. The near-surface waters would have been well oxygenated and were inhabited by a wide range of plankton and free-swimming organisms. However, water circulation within the lagoon was poor, resulting in typically anoxic water at the bottom, deprived of oxygen. The lagoon bottom would have been quite calm, as evidenced by the fine lamination of the rocks, and there is little evidence of bottom-dwelling organisms modifying the sediment. The presence of terrestrial fossils, such as conifers and land-dwelling reptiles indicates that the region would have been near land.

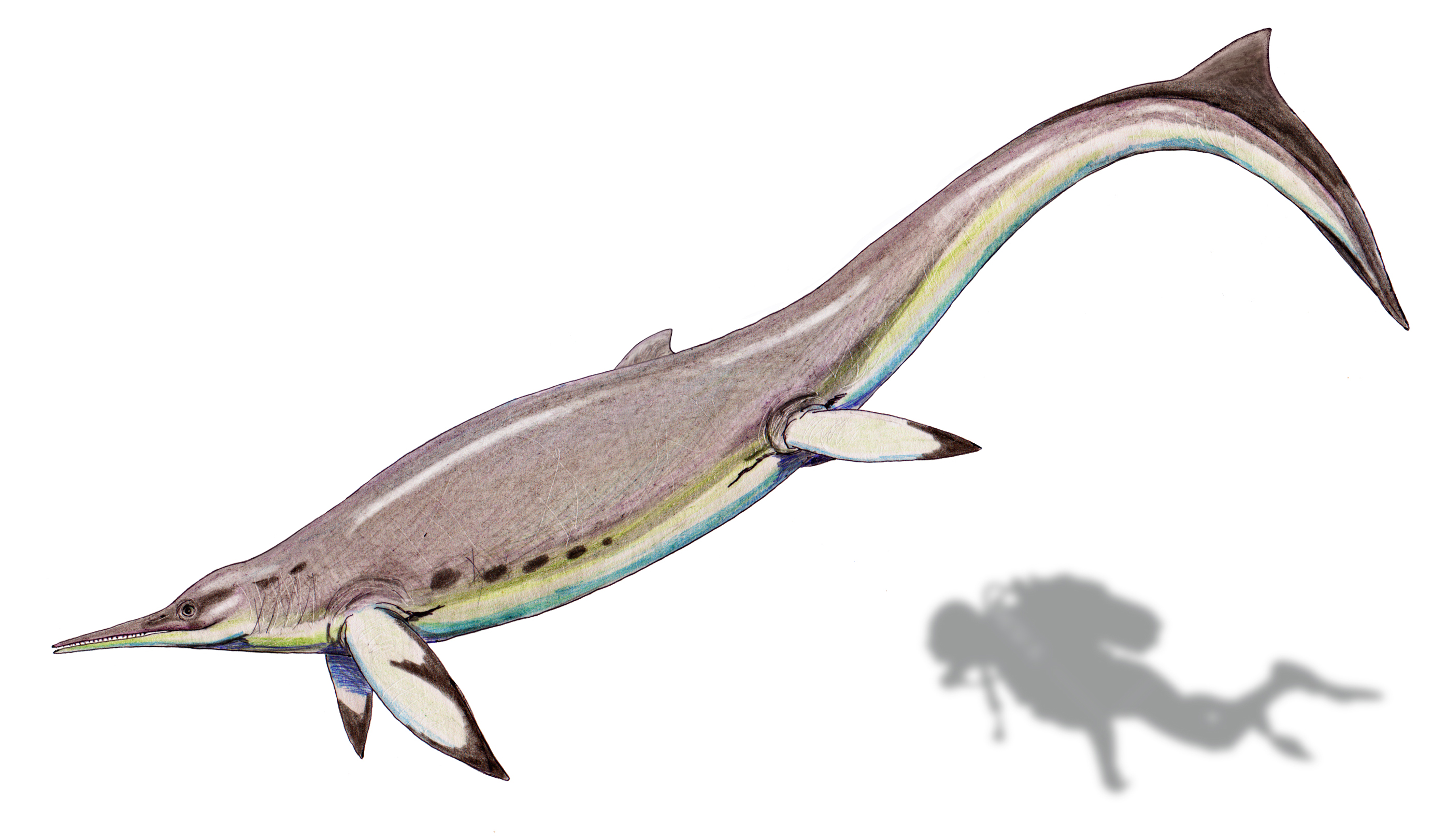
Life restoration of Besanosaurus, an ichthyosaur contemporary with Wimanius

Among the most common of the invertebrates from the Besano Formation is the bivalve Daonella. Many gastropods are known from the Besano Formation; predominantly those that could have lived as plankton or on algae. Cephalopods present include nautiloids, coleoids, and the especially common ammonites. The coleoids from the Besano Formation are not particularly diverse, but this may be due to their remains not readily fossilizing, with many of their known remains being preserved as stomach contents within the bodies of ichthyosaurs. Arthropods known from the formation include ostracods, thylacocephalans, and shrimp. Other, rarer invertebrate groups known from the formation include brachiopods and echinoids, which lived on the seabed. Radiolarians and macroalgae are also known in the formation, though the latter may have been washed in from elsewhere, as with many other bottom-dwelling organisms. A very large number of bony fish have been recorded in this formation. Many bony fish have been recorded in this formation, with actinopterygians being quite diverse, including abundant small species as well as larger representatives like Saurichthys, though rarer sarcopterygian coelacanths were also present. The cartilaginous fish of the Besano Formation are uncommon as well and mainly consist of hybodonts.

Aside from Wimanius, the other ichthyosaurs that have been discovered in the Besano Formation include the small Mixosaurus and Phalarodon as well as the imposing Besanosaurus and Cymbospondylus. Various sauropterygians are known from the Besano Formation, including the shell-crushing placodonts Paraplacodus and Cyamodus as well as pachypleurosaurs and nothosaurids. The pachypleurosaur Odoiporosaurus is known from the middle Besano Formation, while the particularly abundant Serpianosaurus did not appear until the upper portion of the formation, when ichthyosaurs were much less common. Nothosaurids from the Besano Formation consist of Silvestrosaurus buzzii, Nothosaurus giganteus, and an additional species of Nothosaurus, potentially N. juvenilis. While rare, N. giganteus may have been an apex predator like Cymbospondylus. Besides ichthyosaurs and sauropterygians, marine reptiles in the Besano Formation are represented by the thalattosaurs Askeptosaurus, Clarazia, and Hescheleria in addition to the semiaquatic, long-necked Tanystropheus.

== See also ==
- List of ichthyosaurs
- Timeline of ichthyosaur research
