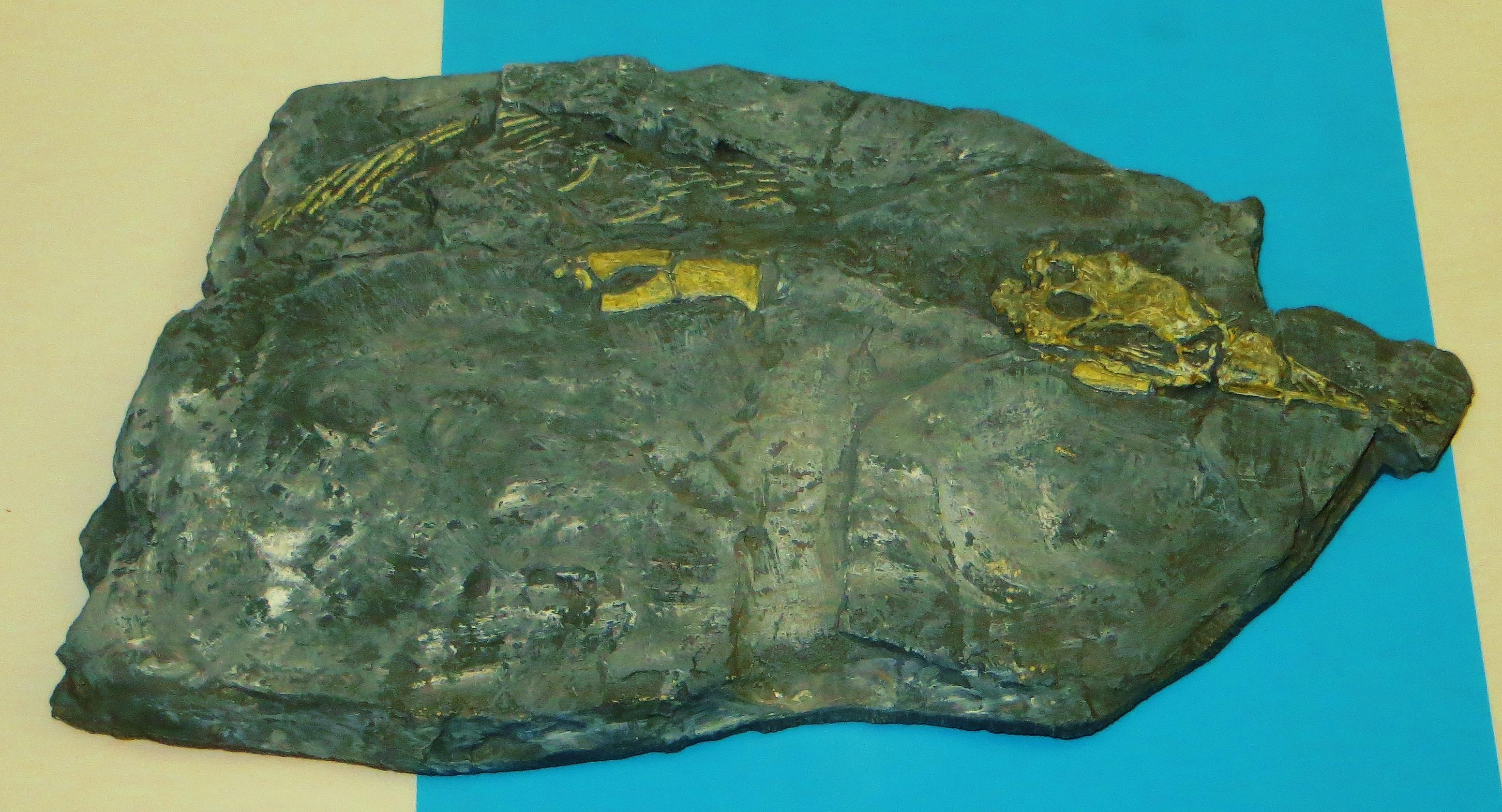
- Fossil

Scientific classification
- Kingdom: Animalia
- Phylum: Chordata
- Class: Reptilia
- Superorder: †Ichthyopterygia
- Family: †Thaisauridae; Maisch, 2010
- Genus: †Thaisaurus; Mazin et al., 1991

Type species
- †Thaisaurus chonglakmanii Mazin et al., 1991

= Thaisaurus =

Thaisaurus Temporal range: Early Triassic

Extinct genus of reptiles

Thaisaurus is an extinct genus of ichthyopterygian marine reptile that lived during the Spathian (late Olenekian, Early Triassic). Fossils have been found in Thailand.

== Discovery ==
The type specimen of Thaisaurus was discovered by Chongpan Chonglakmani on the hill Khao Thong, around Phattalung, Thailand. This specimen consists of a skull, partial vertebral series, and an incomplete fore- and hindlimb and was preserved in resistant dolomite, alongside two other poorly preserved natural molds of other specimens. The type specimen was subsequently extracted in 1988 by a joint paleontological expedention from Thailand and France. The specimen is housed in the Department of Mineral Resources of Bangkok, where it received the number TF2454. The specimen has yet to be fully prepared. Mazin and colleagues described the specimen in 1991, naming it Thaisaurus chonglakmanii, in honor of the country it came from and its discoverer.

== Description ==
Thaisaurus is a small ichthyopterygian, a group of marine reptiles. While later members of this group were not unlike fish in body shape, Early Triassic ichthyopterygians had more lizard-like bodies. However, they still possessed low tail fins and their limbs were encased in flippers. While rather similar to its fellow ichthyopterygian Chaohusaurus, Thaisaurus also shows some differences. Some features of Thaisaurus resemble those of the later, better adapted ichthyosaurs while others represent the group's ancestral characteristics. However, the anatomy of Thaisaurus is poorly understood, with further preparation and study needed.

The skull of Thaisaurus bears enlarged, rounded orbits (openings that housed the eyes) and is drawn out into a long, thin snout. The massive frontals and parietals, two pairs of skull roof bones, both contact the pineal foramen (a small hole along the skull's midline). The small, broad supratemporal fenestrae (openings behind the orbits) have quadrangular boundaries. The outer edges of these openings are formed by the well-developed postorbitals (paired skull bones behind the orbits). To the rear edges of the postorbitals are the small squamosals. An elongated ridge is present along the rear edges of the postorbitals. The postfrontals (a pair of skull roof bones) do not form any part of the borders of the supratemporal fenestrae.

The narrow, pointed teeth of Thaisaurus are all identical in shape and firmly implanted in extensive, partially enclosed sockets. The outer surfaces of their crowns are smooth and the roots lack infolding. The teeth in its lower jaw are smaller than those in its upper. Unlike Grippia and Chaohusaurus, Mazin and colleagues reported that Thaisaurus did not have blunted teeth at the back of its jaws. However, Motani noted in 2003 that the back teeth of Thaisaurus are not exposed, so the presence or absence of blunt teeth cannot be confirmed.

The centra (bodies) of presacral vertebrae, those in front of the hips, are short measured from front to back, differing from the much more elongate vertebrae in the tail. The neural spines in the area of the hips are tall, some exceeding twice the height of the centra. The known ribs of Thaisaurus are single-headed, each bearing just one surface articulating with the vertebra. The forelimbs of Thaisaurus are longer than its hindlimbs, with both sets of limbs composed of elongated bones. Each humerus (upper arm bone) is straight and lacks a projecting flange on its front edge. Similar to Chaohusaurus, Thaisaurus has a large, forwards projection on the upper end of each radius (front lower arm bone), as well as ulnae (rear lower arm bones) with constricted shafts. The femora (upper leg bones) are straight and are three quarters the length of the humerus. The first and fifth metacarpals are identical in size. There are a total of five digits in each hindlimb.

== Classification ==
=== Validity ===
Mazin and colleagues in 1991 considered the features exhibited by Thaisaurus to be unique among ichthyopterygians. In 2003, however, Motani argued that some of these supposed distinctive features were actually a result of misinterpretation on the fossils. He considered it possible that the specimen instead represented a juvenile Chaohusaurus, though noted that more preparation would be needed before more detailed study could be conducted. However, Maisch did not consider the synonymy of Thaisaurus and Chaohusaurus plausible, considering the two genera to be sufficiently distinct, and in 2010, named a new monotypic family, Thaisauridae, for the former. Nevertheless, he also agreed that restudy was necessary.

=== Phylogeny ===
While Thaisaurus is widely regarded as a basal (early-diverging) ichthyopterygian, its relationships with other basal ichthyopterygians are not well understood due to the poor preservation of the holotype, frequently leading to its exclusion from analyses of ichthyosaur relationships. Mazin and colleagues noted in 1991 that the ichthyopterygians of the Early Triassic could be divided into two groups: one with shortened snouts and crushing teeth, the other with longer snouts and uniform conical teeth. They considered the former group to potentially be relatives of the mixosaurids and omphalosaurids, while the latter group, to which they assigned Thaisaurus, were considered part of the "true" ichthyosaur line that persisted beyond the Triassic.

However, later studies of ichthyopterygians did not support this dichotomy. Motani's 1999 cladistic analysis found various Early Triassic ichthyopterygians, such as Utatsusaurus but also Grippia and Chaohusaurus, to form a grade leading to the "intermediate" ichthyosaurs of the later Triassic, which in turn gave rise to the post-Triassic ichthyosaurs. Due to its poor preservation, Motani did not include Thaisaurus in the analysis, instead listing it as Ichthyopterygia incertae sedis. Another cladistic analysis of the group was conducted by Maisch and Matzke in 2000. While not without differences, their topology was broadly similar to that of Motani's. They included Thaisaurus in their analysis, finding it to be the first-diverging member of the group. However, Motani voiced doubts about the stability of the topology at the base of the cladogram recovered by Maisch and Matzke.

== See also ==
- List of ichthyosaurs
- Timeline of ichthyosaur research
