= Parvinatator =

Parvinatator Temporal range: Early Triassic–Middle Triassic

Scientific classification
- Kingdom: Animalia
- Phylum: Chordata
- Class: Reptilia
- Superorder: †Ichthyopterygia
- Family: †Parvinatatoridae; McGowan and Motani, 2003
- Genus: †Parvinatator; Nicholls and Brinkman, 1995

Type species
- †Parvinatator wapitiensis Nicholls and Brinkman, 1995

Extinct genus of reptiles

Parvinatator (lit. 'little swimmer') is an extinct genus of small ichthyopterygian marine reptile that lived during the Early to Middle Triassic. Its fossils have been found in British Columbia, Canada.

== Geological information ==
The only known Parvinatator fossil was located in an unknown horizon from the Sulfur Mountain Formation in a talus deposit, so its exact geological age is unknown. Best estimates place the fossil somewhere between the Olenekian and Ladinian age around 251-235 mya. Other small ichthyosaurs have been found nearby, including Grippia, Utatsusaurus, and Phalarodon.

== Discovery ==
Parvinatator wapitiensis was discovered in the Sulfur Mountain Formation in British Columbia, Canada, by Elisabeth Nicholls and Don Brinkman in 1995. The only fossil recovered of this genus is a partial skull and two forefins. The skull has been tectonically deformed, partially dis-articulated and broken with the posterior section rotated forward into the orbit. The left forefin is well preserved with only minor overlapping and breakage, while the right forefin is heavily overlapped and broken.

== Description and paleobiology ==
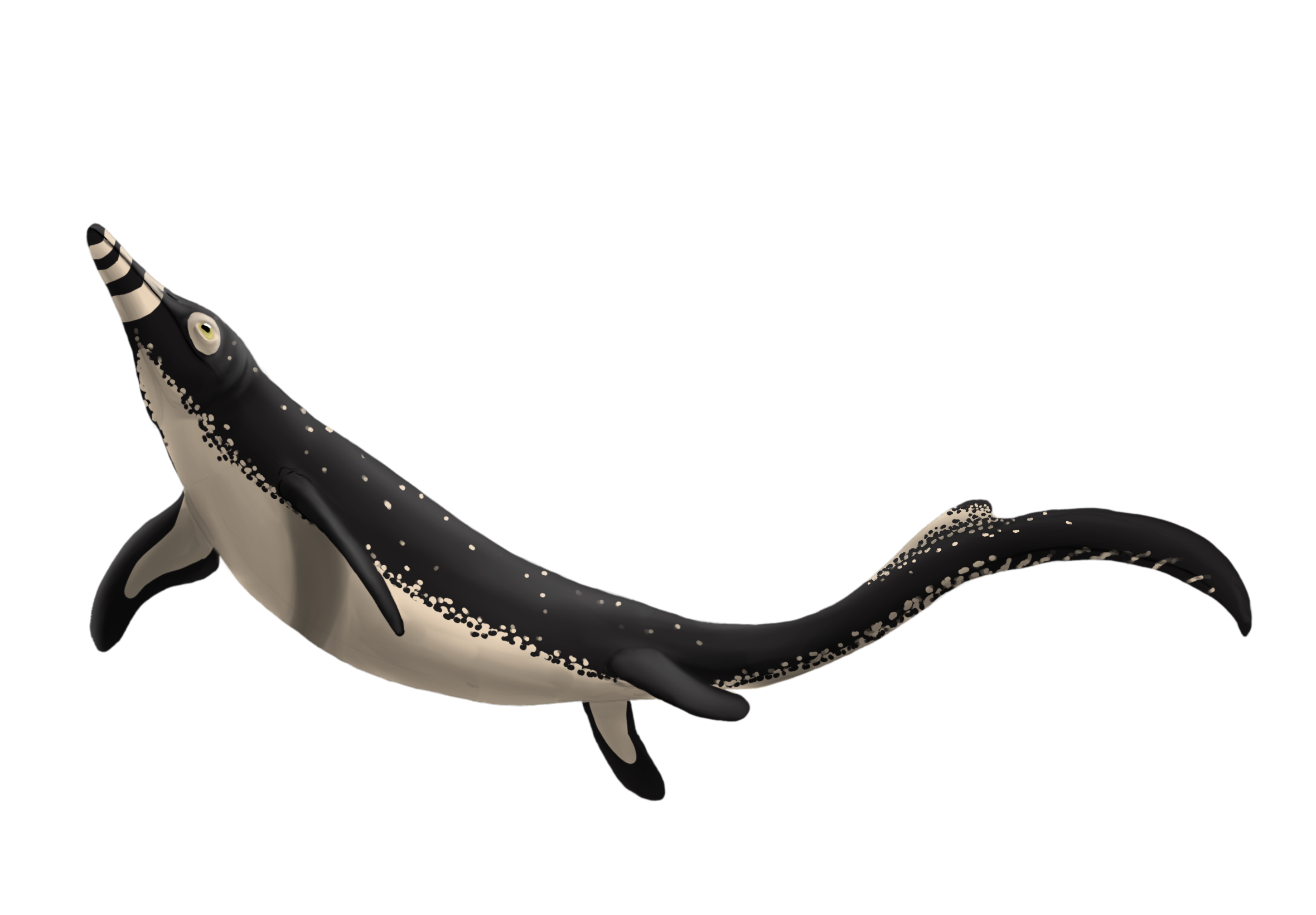
Restoration

Based on analysis of tooth size relative to the skull width, Parvinatator is estimated to be less than 1 meter long, approximately the same size and general shape of other basal ichthyosaurs, although it is unknown if Parvinatator lacked a dorsal fin like Utatsusaurus and Grippia. Also like other early ichthyosaurs, Parvinatator most likely used an eel-like lateral body movement for propulsion, known as anguilliform. Based on jaw size and tooth shape, Parvinatator is thought to have feed on small fish and cephalopods similarly to other basal ichthyosaurs, as opposed to hard shelled organisms such as mollusks and clams. Ichthyosaurs typically had large eyes suggesting they would hunt in the dark, either at night or in deep water. After the skull's dis-articulated orbit was reconstructed, it matched the approximate shape and typical size of other ichthyosaurs eyes.

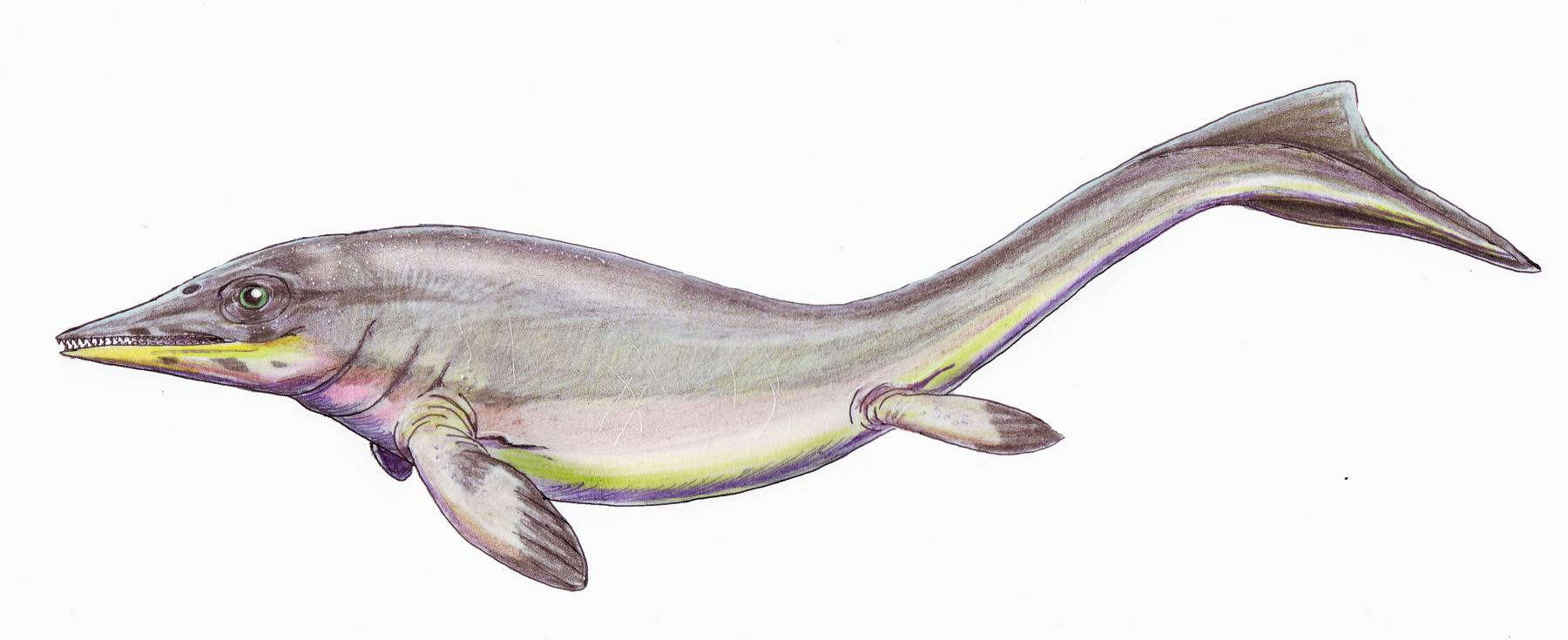
Grippia longirostris from the early Triassic is a close relative.

=== Skull ===
The fossil of the skull is small, measuring approximately 15 cm in width by 10 cm in height. The skull had been dis-articulated, broken and tectonically deformed, but was reconstructed by Ryosuke Motani, leading to several differences from Nicholls and Brinkman's original description, including; the presence of the squamosal, quadratojugal, and a reduced supratemporal, a lack of contact between the prefrontal and postfrontal, as well as between the jugal and quadratojugal (which was previously identified as the squamosal). Other diagnostic characteristics of the Parvinatator skull are as follows:

- The retroarticular process, composed of the articular, surangular, and angular, is present and well developed. This is suggested to be a derived trait for all ichthyosaurs.
- The quadratojugal is high and narrow, laterally covering the quadrate.
- The jugal and quadratojugal have a deep notch between them, agreeing with the lack of a lower temporal fenestra or lower zygomatic arch as in all other ichthyosaurs.
- The postorbital is enlarged and overlaps the jugal along the posterior of the orbit, forming a natural articulation point.
- The orbit is oval in shape, being longer than tall.
- The external naris is enclosed by the premaxilla, maxilla and nasal bone, separate from a well developed lacrimal.

=== Forefin ===
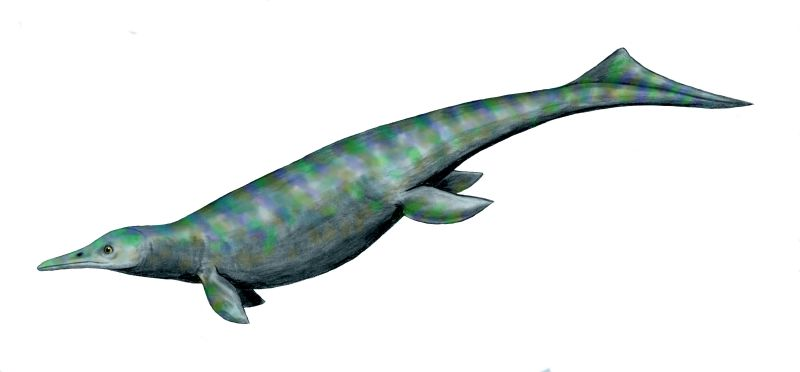
Utatsusaurus, another close relative.

Unlike some basal ichthyosaurs, Parvinatator's forefin appears well adapted for aquatic life, although it was probably used for controlling pitch rather than locomotion. On the well preserved left forefin of Parvinatator the ulna is reduced in both length and width and smaller than the radius. Several bones of digits 4 and 5 are fused together as well.

== Phylogeny ==
There is some disagreement about the exact location of Parvinatator among its relatives. The following phylogeny by Motani places Parvinatator with Utatsusaurus as basal ichthyopterygians but not true ichthyosaurs.

- Ichthyopterygia
  - Utatsusaurus
  - Parvinatator
  - Eoichthyosauria
    - Grippidia
      - Chaohusaurus
      - Grippia
    - Ichthyosauria
      - Cymbospondylus
      - - Mixosauria
        - Merriamosauria
          - Shastasauria
          - Euichthyosauria
            - Toretocnemus
            - - Californosaurus
              - Parvipelvia
                - Macgowania
                - - Hudsonelpidia
                  - - Suevoleviathan
                    - - Eurhinosauria
                      - Temnodontosaurus
                      - Thunnosauria
                        - Stenopterygius
                        - - Ichthyosaurus
                          - Ophthalmosauria

However, according to Maisch and Matzke in 2000, Parvinatator is a true ichthyosaur and more derived than Utatsusaurus and Grippia.

- Ichthyosauria
  - Thaisaurus
  - - Utatsusaurus
    - - Grippidia
        - Chaohusaurus
        - Grippia
      - - Parvinatator
        - - Quasianosteosaurus
          - Hueneosauria
            - Mixosauria
            - Longipinnati
              - Toretocnemidae
              - - Cymbospondylidae
                - Merriamosauria

== See also ==
- List of ichthyosaurs
- Timeline of ichthyosaur research
