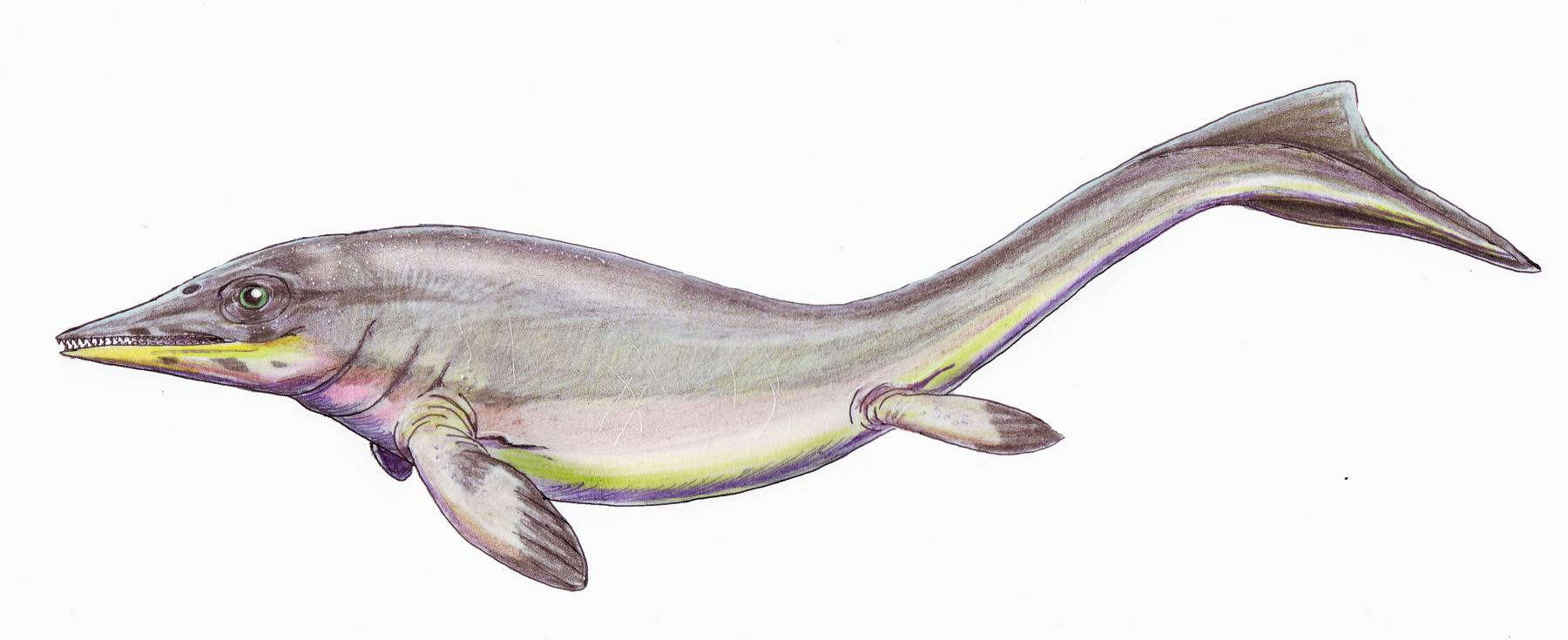
- Life restoration

Scientific classification
- Kingdom: Animalia
- Phylum: Chordata
- Class: Reptilia
- Order: †Grippidia
- Family: †Grippiidae
- Genus: †Grippia; Wiman, 1930
- Species: †G. longirostris

Binomial name
- †Grippia longirostris Wiman, 1929

= Grippia =

Grippia Temporal range: Early Triassic, 249.9–246.7 Ma

Extinct genus of reptiles

Grippia is a genus of early ichthyopterygian, an extinct group of reptiles that resembled dolphins. Its only species is Grippia longirostris. It was a relatively small ichthyopterygian, measuring around 1–1.5 metres (3.3–4.9 ft) long. Fossil remains from Svalbard from the specimen SVT 203 were originally assigned to G. longirostris but are now thought to have belonged to a non-ichthyopterygian diapsid related to Helveticosaurus.

== Discovery ==
Fossils have been found along the coasts of Greenland, China, Japan, Norway, and Canada (Sulfur Mountain Formation); of Early Triassic age. No complete skeletons have ever been found. However, well-preserved remains have been found, with the most notable ones including:

- The Marine Ironstone found in Agardh Bay Norway. This specimen consists of a partial skull fossil; however, it was lost during World War II and presumably destroyed.
- Previously, the Vega Phroso Siltstone Member of the Sulphur Mountain Formation in British Columbia. This specimen consists of a well preserved forelimb, several ribs, and a single centrum. However, it has now been reclassified as Gulosaurus helmi, a close relative of Grippia.

The first G. longirostris skull was found in 1929. Many palaeontologists believe it was the most complete specimen ever found, however, it was destroyed in a bombing raid on Germany in WWII.

Grippia longirostris was an entirely marine species and is considered to be the most basal example of Ichthyopterygia. G. longirostris measured in at 1–1.5m (3.3–4.9 feet) in length making it the smallest species within the superorder Ichthyopterygia. Other definitive features of G. longirostris include the arrangement of carpals and metacarpals that constitute the forelimbs and the morphology of the skull. Members of this species swam via lateral movements of their tail similar to that of a modern-day eel.

== Description ==
The skeletal structure of G. longirostris has been documented, especially the forelimbs by Ryosuke Motani in 1998 and the skull by Ryosuke Motani in 2000. These studies involved modern documentation and research of previously discovered specimens.

=== Skull ===
Several different Grippia skulls have been analyzed since 1929. Seven well known cranial specimens belonging to G. longirostris were reanalyzed, to construct detailed descriptions of each specimen and to form a coherent compilation to represent the genus as a whole. An important thing to note is how no skull has been found to have a snout; therefore any descriptions of the snout are speculative.

Montani constructed several diagrams based on his analysis, which depict the skull of G. longirostris as:

- Having a narrow shape.
- Possessing orbits that are larger than the upper temporal fenestra.
- The quadratojugal does not enter the upper temporal fenestra.
- The anterior margin of the external naris is formed by the premaxilla.
- The postfrontal have a posterior process that overlaps the bone of the large postorbital, similar to the skulls of other basal ichthyosaurs.

=== Forelimbs ===
The forelimbs of G. longirostris are characteristic of the species. Descriptions created by Wiman in 1933 originally depicted G. longirostris as having very primitive forelimbs that were not yet completely specialized for aquatic life. These descriptions involved the presence of "hoofs" at the tips of each digit, this observation has since been discredited.

The most recent descriptions of the forelimbs were performed in 1998 by Motani. This analysis focused on one specimen that was nearly complete, although it was determined to be missing several distal segments of the phalanges. This study revealed:

- Grippia possesses pentadactyl limbs.
- The humerus and phalanges are well developed.
- It possessed an articular radius.
- The ulna and radius extend in a wide fan shape.
- The first four proximal and distal carpals aid in separating the metacarpals.
- The second to fourth metacarpals and phalanges are similar to that of other amniotes, however they are flattened.
- The first and fifth metacarpals and phalanges are lunate in appearance and concave inwards towards the interior carpals.
- The phalanges of the distal end of the fourth and fifth digits appear to take more of an oval shape.

== Classification ==
Ichthyopterygia are fully aquatic reptiles that evolved from terrestrial tetrapods, with no transitional lineage being discovered so far. Grippia is one of earliest examples of the superorder Ichthyopterygia and is fully adapted to aquatic life.

Grippia are believed to have lived from 250 to 235 Ma during the Olenekian – Anisian of the early to mid-Triassic. Grippia are considered to be basal ichthyosaurs along with several other early genera, with Grippia being the most basal of all of them. This is due to its primitive anatomy when compared to older ichthyosaurs and because Grippia is the most thoroughly studied out of all basal ichthyosaurs.

Below is a cladogram which represents Ichthyopterygia showing how Grippia diverged early in the lineage.

- Ichthyopterygia
  - - Parvinatator wapitiensis
    - Utatsusaurus hataii
  - - Xinminosaurus catactes
    - Eoichthyosauria
      - Grippidia
        - Grippia longirostris
        - Gulosaurus helmi
      - Ichthyosauria sensu Motani (1999)
        - Chaohusaurus geishanensis
        - - Cymbospondylus
          - - Mixosauria
              - Mixosaurus cornalianus
              - Phalarodon atavus
            - - Toretocnemidae
                - Qianichthyosaurus zhoui
                - Toretocnemus californicus
              - - Shastasauria
                  - Shonisaurus popularis
                  - - Shastasaurus pacificus
                    - Callawayia neoscapularis
                - - Guizhouichthyosaurus tangae
                  - - Besanosaurus leptorhynchus
                    - - Californosaurus perrini
                      - Parvipelvia

== Paleobiology ==
Grippia was well adapted to an aquatic lifestyle. It inhabited equatorial to equatorial shallow coastal seas. This paleohabitat was based upon how areas where fossils are found were at equatorial latitudes during the early Triassic, when Grippia lived.

The exact diet of Grippia is highly debated. Analysis of dental remains belonging to G. longirostris has shown blunt posterior teeth and replacement maxillary teeth, which suggests that it practiced an omnivorous feeding style. This evidence is contradictory when cross examined against previous work done in the thirties and eighties, which theorized that G. longirostris practiced a diet specialized in molluscs and small fish. All of these results were based on samples that did not include an existing snout, therefore they were highly speculative and paleontologists will not know what Grippia ate until a full skull is found.

== Paleoecology ==
It is hypothesised that Grippia became extinct because it was outcompeted by more advanced ichthyosaurs. This limited the amount of food that Grippia could secure, eventually leading it to its extinction around 235 Ma.

== See also ==
- List of ichthyosaurs
- Timeline of ichthyosaur research
