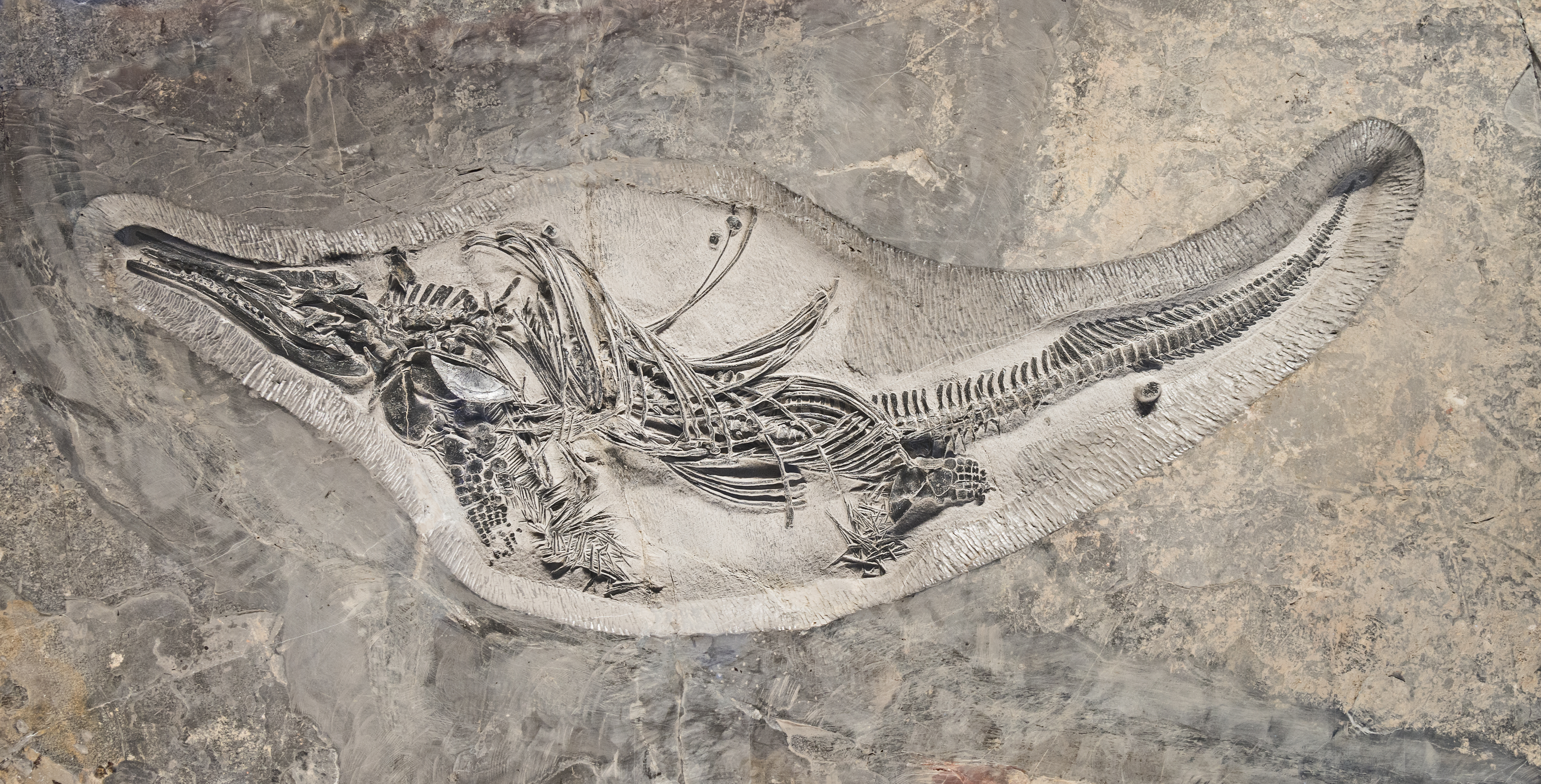
- B. panxianensis (MHNT)

Scientific classification
- Kingdom: Animalia
- Phylum: Chordata
- Class: Reptilia
- Order: †Ichthyosauria
- Family: †Mixosauridae
- Genus: †Barracudasauroides; Maisch, 2010
- Species: †B. panxianensis

Binomial name
- †Barracudasauroides panxianensis Jiang, Schmitz, Hao & Sun, 2006

Synonyms
- Mixosaurus panxianensis Jiang, Schmitz, Hao & Sun, 2006

= Barracudasauroides =

Barracudasauroides Temporal range: Middle Triassic, Anisian

Extinct genus of reptiles

Skeletal mount, National Natural History Museum of China

Barracudasauroides is a genus of mixosaurid ichthyosaur which lived during the Middle Triassic. Fossils of this genus have been found in Guizhou Province, China. It is known from GMPKU-P-1033, a partial skeleton recovered from the Upper Member of the Guanling Formation of Yangjuan village, Xinmin area; this rock unit dates to the Pelsonian substage of the Anisian stage. It was named by Michael W. Maisch in 2010, and the type species is Barracudasauroides panxianensis.

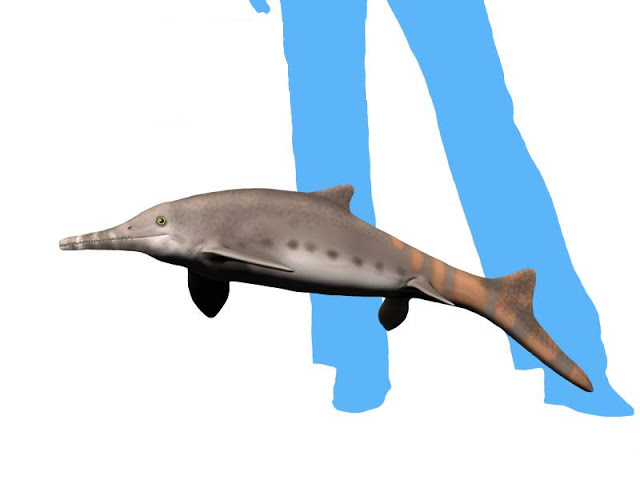
Life restoration

== See also ==
- List of ichthyosaurs
- Timeline of ichthyosaur research
