= Barracudasaurus =

Barracudasaurus Temporal range: Middle Triassic, 242–237 Ma

Scientific classification
- Kingdom: Animalia
- Phylum: Chordata
- Class: Reptilia
- Order: †Ichthyosauria
- Node: †Hueneosauria
- Infraorder: †Mixosauria
- Genus: †Barracudasaurus; Jiang et al. (2005)
- Species: †B. maotaiensis

Binomial name
- †Barracudasaurus maotaiensis Jiang et al. (2005)

Extinct genus of reptiles

Barracudasaurus is a dubious genus of ichthyosaur from the Triassic of China, containing the single species B. maotaiensis.

== Description ==
Barracudasaurus had elongated, conical premaxillary teeth with rounded cross-section and wide spacing. The maxilla is short anteriorly.
