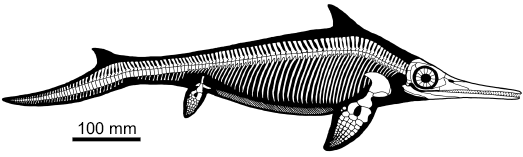
- Skeletal reconstruction of Mixosaurus cornalianus showing soft tissue outline

Scientific classification
- Kingdom: Animalia
- Phylum: Chordata
- Class: Reptilia
- Order: †Ichthyosauria
- Infraorder: †Mixosauria
- Family: †Mixosauridae; Baur, 1887

Genera
- †Barracudasauroides? Maisch, 2010; †Mixosaurus Baur, 1887; †Phalarodon Merriam, 1910

Synonyms
- Mixosauria Motani, 1999

= Mixosauridae =

Mixosauridae Temporal range: Triassic, 247.2–235.0 Ma

Extinct family of Triassic ichthyosaurs

Mixosauridae was an early group of ichthyosaurs, living between 247.2 and 235 million years ago, during the Triassic period. Fossils of mixosaurs have been found across the Northern Hemisphere (Europe, Asia and North America).

== History and classification ==
=== Naming and definitions ===
Mixosauridae was named by Georg Baur in 1887 as a family-level group to contain the new genus, Mixosaurus that he named in the same publication. The name Mixosauria has been used for a larger group containing Mixosauridae, but also as an equivalent term for Mixosauridae, resulting in Mixosauria being regarded as a junior synonym of Mixosauridae. Motani defined the clade Mixosauria as comprising all descendants of the last common ancestor of Mixosaurus cornalianus and M. nordenskioeldii, which was applied to its equivalent group Mixosauridae by Maisch and Matzke in 2000. This definition was emended by Ji and colleagues in 2016 by replacing Mixosaurus nordenskioeldii with Phalarodon fraasi, as the former had since been determined to not be diagnostic. The definition was changed again in 2017, this time by Moon. As the evolutionary relationships his analyses found would have resulted in many traditional mixosaurids falling outside of the group, he redefined it as being all ichthyosaurs more closely related to Mixosaurus cornalianus than Ichthyosaurus communis for consistency.

=== Composition ===
There are six species of mixosaurids widely accepted as valid: Mixosaurus cornalianus, Mixosaurus kuhnschnyderi, Mixosaurus panxianensis, Phalarodon atavus, Phalardon callawayi, and Phalarodon fraasi. An additional species, Mixosaurus luxiensis, was named in 2024. Mixosaurus xindianensis is sometimes also considered valid, but has also been treated as a species inquirenda. Other mixosaurid species have been proposed in the past but subsequently had their validity questioned or rejected. These include Mixosaurus nordenskioeldii, of which Phalarodon fraasi was traditionally seen a junior synonym, and Mixosaurus maotianensis, for which the genus Barracudasaurus was proposed, before the referred specimens were reassigned to M. panxianensis, among others. Grippia was once considered a junior synonym of Mixosaurus, however, restudy has revealed that the two genera are significantly different, and Grippia is now understood to instead be a basal ichthyopterygian, not a mixosaurid. The very poorly-known Tholodus has also been proposed to be a mixosaurid, however, the very fragmentary nature of its remains make its relationships unclear, and it has also been proposed to be related to various other ichthyopterygians. Additionally, a specimen potentially belonging to the toretocnemid Qianichthyosaurus was initially misidentified as a species of Mixosaurus, M. guanlingensis.

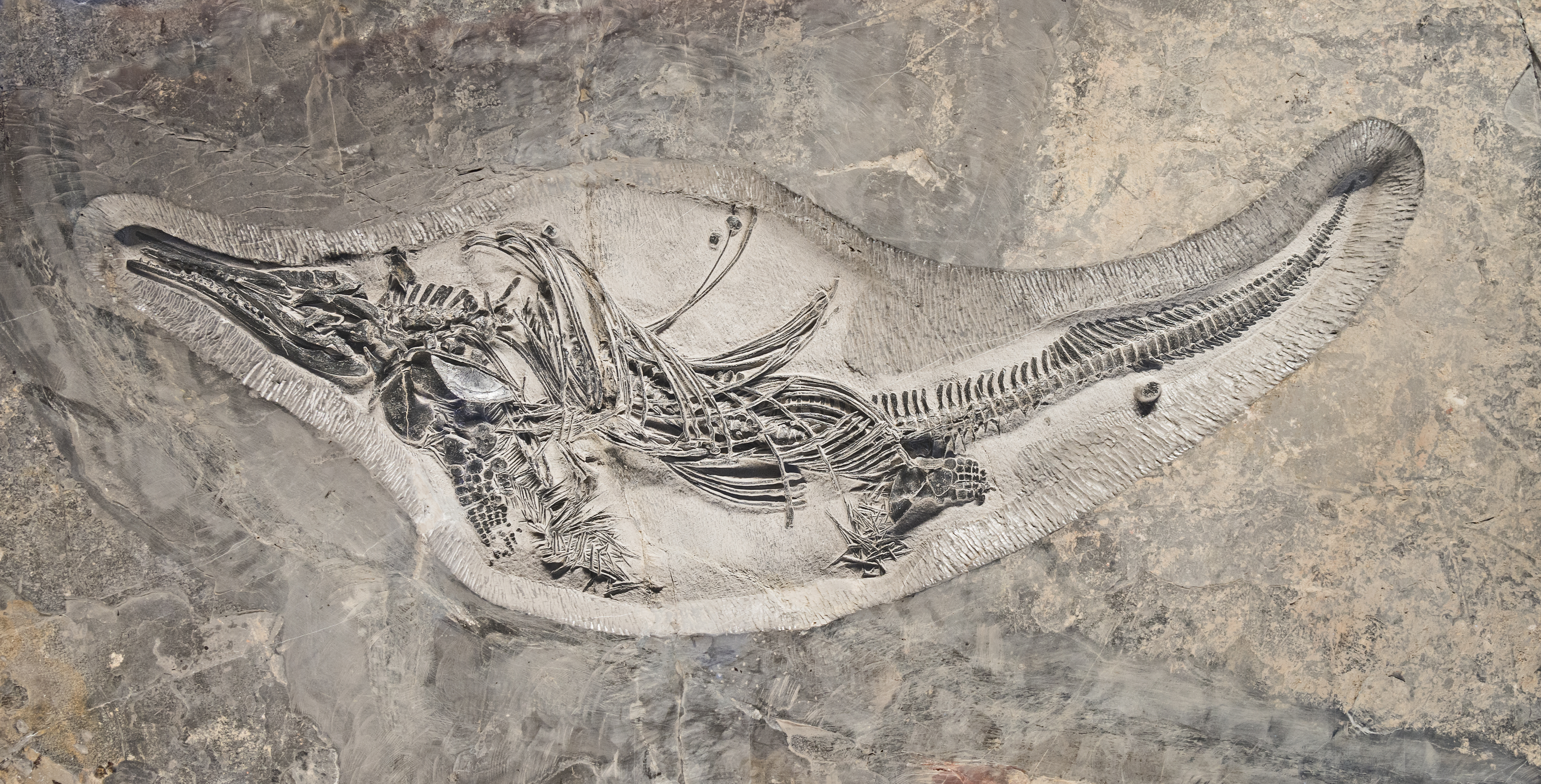
Skeleton of Mixosaurus panxianensis, sometimes assigned to its own genus Barracudasauroides

The number of mixosaurid genera is controversial. Traditionally, Mixosaurus was generally regarded as the only valid genus of mixosaurids, and this system of classification continued to be used into the 21st century. However, Phalarodon was also sometimes treated as a separate genus, a position which later became widely accepted. In 1998, Maisch and Matzke named a new genus, Contectopalatus, for P. atavus, and later maintained its distinctiveness from Mixosaurus and Phalarodon. M. panxianensis is also sometimes treated as a separate genus, Barracudasauroides. Additionally, M. kuhnschnyderi was initially named as a separate genus, Sangiorgiosaurus, by Brinkmann in 1998, who sunk it into Mixosaurus later during the same year, an assignment agreed upon by other authors. While most researchers accept only Mixosaurus and Phalarodon as valid, in 2017, Moon cautioned that the standard concepts of Mixosaurus and Phalarodon may not be monophyletic. The following cladograms show two hypotheses for the evolutionary relationships between different mixosaurid species.

Cladogram following the 50% majority rule consensus tree of Fang and colleagues, 2024.

- - - Mixosaurus cornalianus
    - - Mixosaurus luxiensis
      - Mixosaurus kuhnschnyderi
      - Mixosaurus panxianensis
  - - Phalarodon atavus
    - - Phalarodon fraasi
      - Phalarodon callawayi

Cladogram following the preferred tree of Moon, 2017.

- - Barracudasauroides panxianensis
  - - Mixosaurus xindianensis
    - Phalarodon fraasi
    - - Contectopalatus atavus
      - Phalarodon callawayi
    - - Mixosaurus cornalianus
      - Mixosaurus kuhnschnyderi

=== Higher-level classification ===
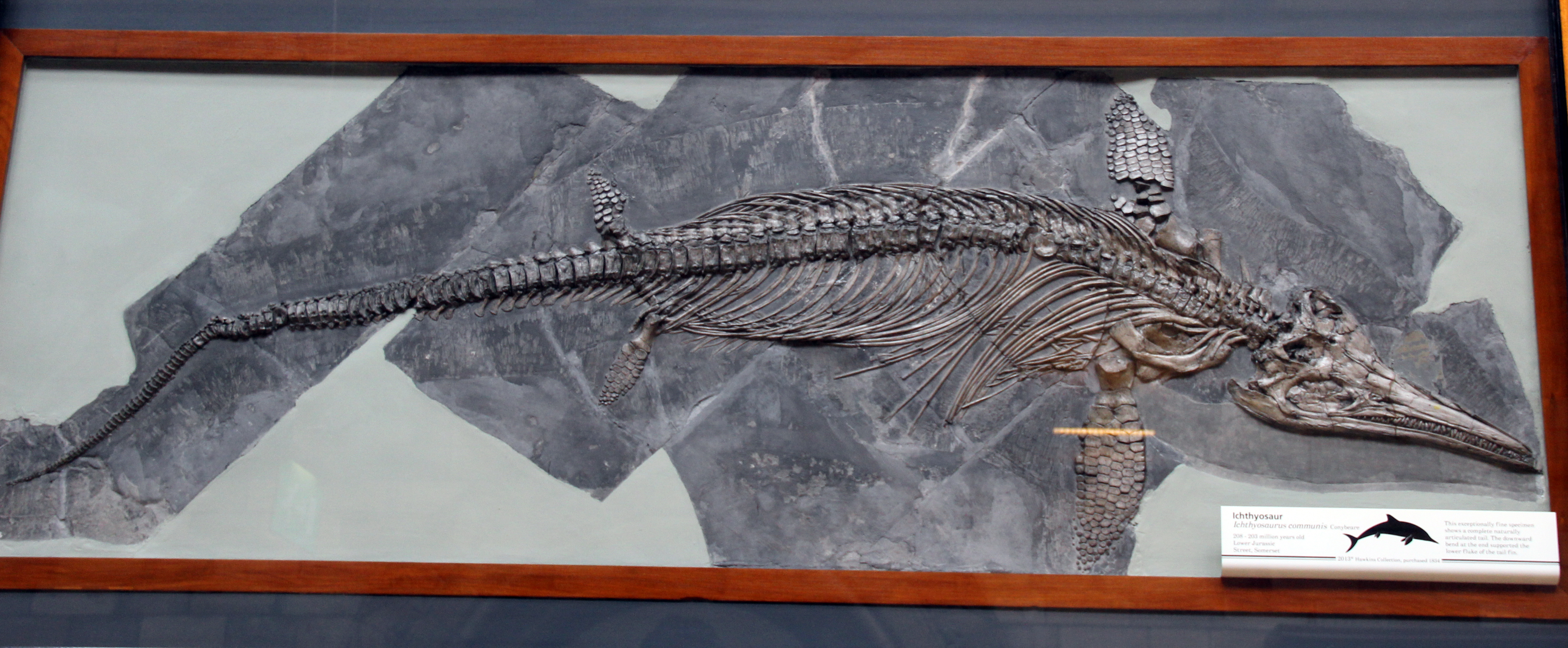
Skeleton of Ichthyosaurus. Historically, mixosaurids were frequently considered ancestral to Ichthyosaurus

In his 1887 description, Baur recognized mixosaurids as a "primitive" group of ichthyosaurs. In 1904, Boulenger considered Ichthyosauria as splittable into three divisions, with Mixosaurus an early member of the group leading to the wide-finned Ichthyosaurus. In 1908, Merriam remarked that it was difficult to reconstruct the interrelationships of ichthyosaurs with confidence. However, he considered that all well-known Triassic ichthyosaurs at the time were too specialized to have been ancestral to the later species, pointing to the anatomy of the ribs in particular. Therefore, he proposed an early split between the Triassic ichthyosaurs and the post-Triassic ichthyosaurs. In the 1920s, von Huene proposed a classification scheme where ichthyosaurs were divided into two different groups, the latipinnates and longipinnates, which split from each other in the Triassic and both persisted into the Cretaceous. These divisions were based primarily on the structure of the forelimb, though McGowan argued in 1972 that the two groups could be differentiated by skull proportions as well. Under this classification scheme, mixosaurids were classified as early latipinnates, with von Huene believing them to be the direct ancestors of Ichthyosaurus.

The classification of ichthyosaurs into latipinnates and longipinnates persisted for many decades. However, in 1979, Appleby reassessed mixosaurid anatomy, and found it to be very specialized. These specializations did not suggest to him that mixosaurids were ancestral to the later latipinnates; often their features differed markedly or the mixosaurids were more specialized than their supposed descendants. Consequently, he named a new monotypic order for the mixosaurids, Mixosauroidea, and instead argued that the post-Triassic latipinnates evolved from the longipinnate line. Despite initially supporting the dichotomy, McGowan would go even further than Appleby in overturning the latipinnate-longipinnate classification, considering that the differences separating the two groups were too ambiguous to be valid.

The first cladogram of Ichthyopterygia was published by Mazin in 1981, in which mixosaurids were found to fall outside Ichthyosauria, though in a more derived position than Grippia. Based on these results, Mazin argued that heterodonty was the ancestral conidition in ichthyopterygians. Nicholls and colleagues in 1999 placed mixosaurids in Ichthyosauria, arguing based on tooth and shoulder girdle anatomy that they were the sister taxon of a group composed of Utatsusaurus, Grippia, and Omphalosaurus. These two groups were placed in a suborder that was named Mixosauria.

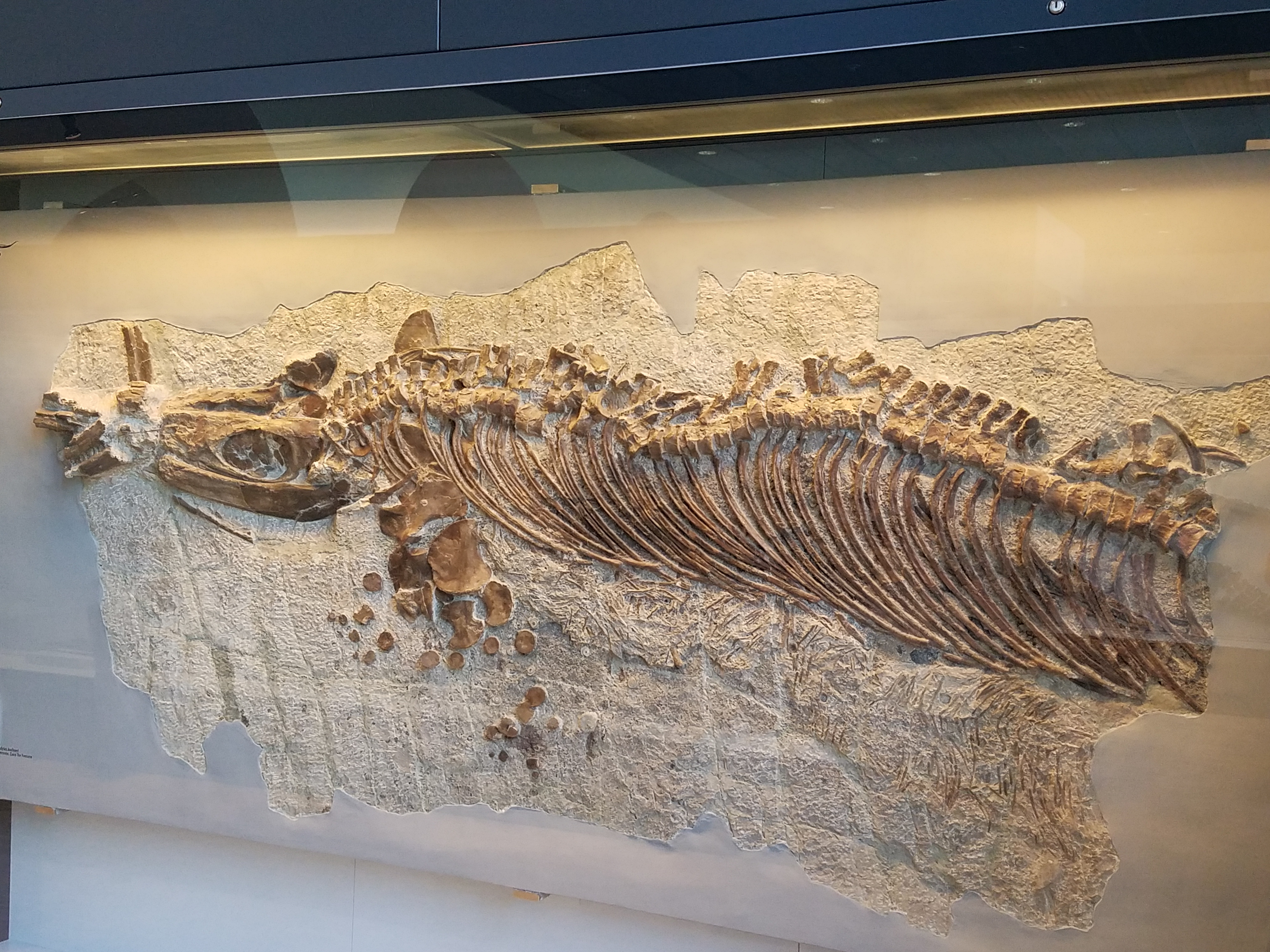
Skeleton of Cymbospondylus. Exactly how mixosaurids and Cymbospondylus are related to other ichthyosaurs is uncertain

In 1999 and 2000, multiple major phylogenetic analyses of Ichthyopterygia were published. These studies all agreed upon a general framework, with three nested groups: the early "basal grade", followed by an intermediate grade, followed in turn by the derived, "fish-shaped" ichthyosaurs. Utatsusaurus and Grippia were found to belong to the basal grade, but mixosaurids were instead recovered in the intermediate grade, together with the shastasaurids and Cymbospondylus. Thus, mixosaurids were found to be members of Ichthyosauria. The first of these analyses was done by Motani in 1999, who found mixosaurids to be more derived than Cymbospondylus but less so than the true shastasaurs. The phylogenetic analysis run by Sander and Maisch and Matzke the next year instead found mixosaurids to be more basal than Cymbospondylus. Additionally, Maisch and Matzke argued that the poorly-known Wimanius was the sister taxon of Mixosauridae. Due to its fragmentary nature, however, both Motani and Sander considered the relationships of this genus provisional, with Sander instead considering it a shastasaurid.

In 2008, Maisch and colleagues noted that toretocnemids shared multiple features with mixosaurids, and suggested that the two groups might be closely related, rather than the toretocnemids having branched off later. As they did not run an analysis to test this hypothesis, however, they considered it provisional. Maisch did not follow this hypothesis in his 2010 review, though he used the name Mixosauria for a group containing mixosaurids and Wimanius. Further phylogenetic analyses were conducted since, often drawing from the analysis of Motani and that of Maisch and Matzke. In 2016, Ji and colleagues found mixosaurids to be more derived than cymbospondylids based on their analysis. However, in 2017, Moon recovered the mixosaurids as more basal. Additionally, Wimanius was found to be a more derived member of Ichthyosauria than the mixosaurids. Moon also noted that the "intermediate grade" ichthyosaurs could be divided into two subgroups, with mixosaurids and Cymbospondylus part of the early grade, paraphyletic to the later grade which gave rise to the later ichthyosaurs. The relative positions of mixosaurids and Cymbospondylus remain unresolved.

Cladogram following Ji and colleagues, 2016.

- Ichthyosauria
  - Cymbospondylidae
  - Hueneosauria
    - Mixosauridae
    - Merriamosauria
      - Shastasauridae
      - Euichthyosauria

Cladogram following the preferred tree of Moon, 2017.

- Ichthyosauria
  - Parvinatator wapitiensis
  - Thalattoarchon saurophagis
  - Xinminosaurus catactes
  - Mixosauridae
  - - Pessopteryx nisseri
    - Cymbospondylus spp.
    - - Phantomosaurus neubigi
      - Merriamosauria
        - Besanosaurus leptorhynchus
        - Californosaurus perrini
        - Phalarodon major
        - Qianichthyosaurus xingyiensis
        - Wimanius odontopalatus
        - Shastasauridae
        - Euichthyosauria

== Description ==
Thanks to a large number of good specimens, mixosaurid anatomy is well understood. Mixosaurids show a variety of adaptations for life in the water, with their limbs modified into fins and their deep, streamlined bodies. Mixosaurids were not as dolphin-shaped as the later parvipelvians, but they were also not eel-shaped like the earliest ichthyopterygians. Mixosaurids are among the smaller ichthyosaurs, with a total length of under 1 metre (3.3 ft) in the smallest species, making them among the smallest of ichthyosaurs. While typically around 2 metres (6.6 ft) long at maximum, fragmentary fossils suggest that some mixosaurids could have grown as long as 5 metres (16 ft), though the poor quality of preservation makes these larger sizes contentious. Mixosaurids are very specialized ichthyosaurs, and possess many distinctive features.

=== Skull ===
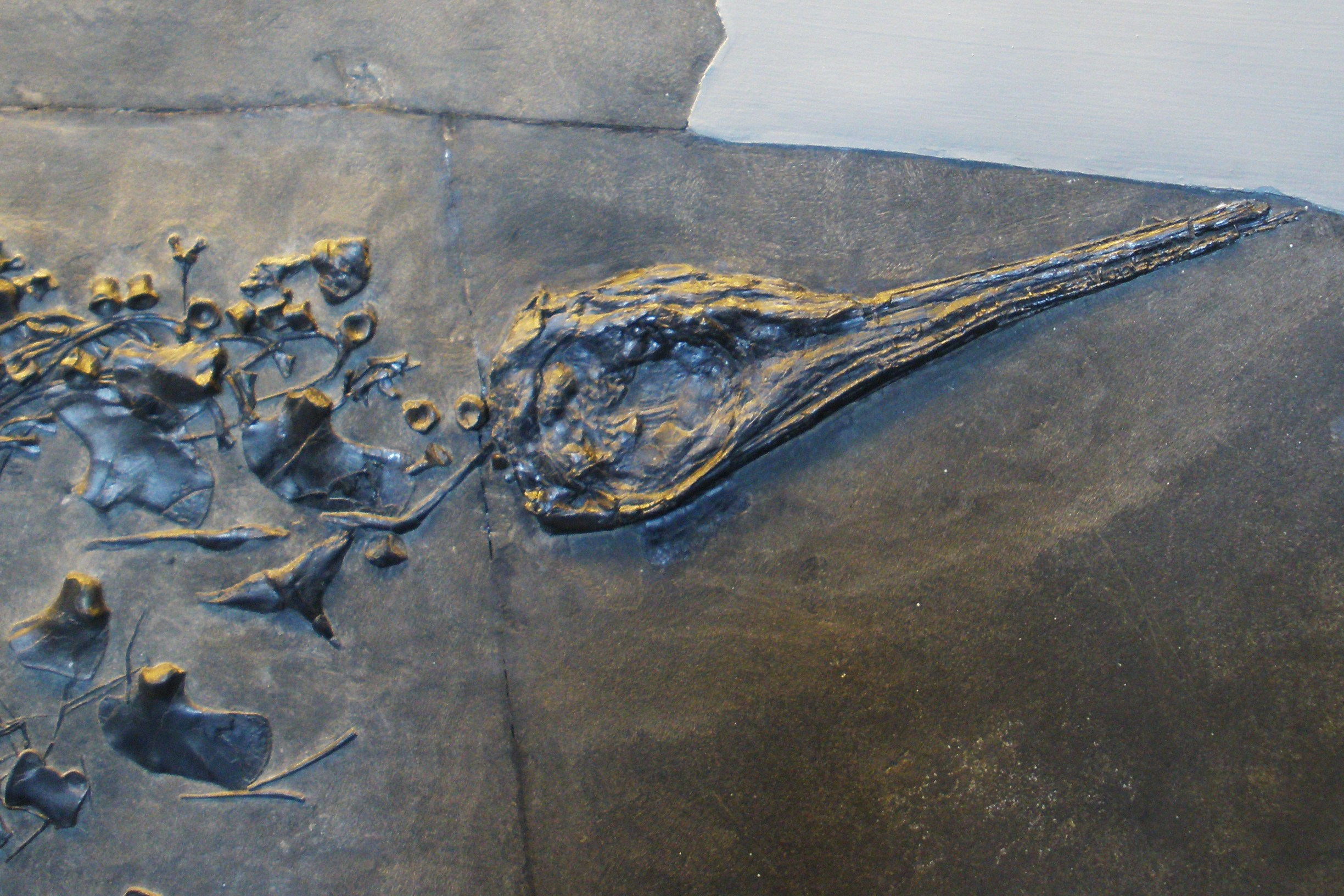
Skull and front part of the skeleton of Mixosaurus cornalianus

Mixosaurids have large skulls, making up roughly one fourth to one fifth of the animal's total length. The front region of the mixosaurid skull is drawn out into a long, thin snout, with lengthened premaxillae in the upper jaw. At their hind ends, the premaxillae taper to points, and do not form much of the rims of the external nares, the openings which housed the nostrils. The external nares usually face towards the sides, though in Phalarodon callawayi they instead are angled upwards. Behind the premaxillae are the maxillae, tooth-bearing bones of roughly triangular shape. The upper, or dorsal, processes of the maxillae contact the prefrontals on both the inside and the outside of the skull, which blocks the lacrimals from the borders of the external nares. Mixosaurids have round, large orbits, which can result in the skull being distorted during preservation. Within the orbits are rings of strong bony plates, called scleral rings, which supported the eyeballs. The openings within the rings are large.

Like other members of Ichthyosauria, the upper rims of the orbits is formed by the prefrontals and postfrontals. In mixosaurids, these bones are reinforced and form a crest along the edges of the anterior terraces of the supratemporal fenestrae. The anterior terraces are massive depressions on the skull, typical of Triassic ichthyopterygians. In mixosaurids, however, they are unusually expansive, involving the nasal bones. These terraces flank a long sagittal crest that extends along the skull roof, spanning across three pairs of bones, the nasals, frontals, and parietals, from front to back. This crest can be quite tall in some species. The openings behind the orbits, the supratemporal fenestrae, are hidden beneath flanges extending from the supratemporal bones when viewed from above. The parietals bear a ridge towards their posterior end, and the processes stemming from their rear fork are short, as seen in later ichthyosaurs.

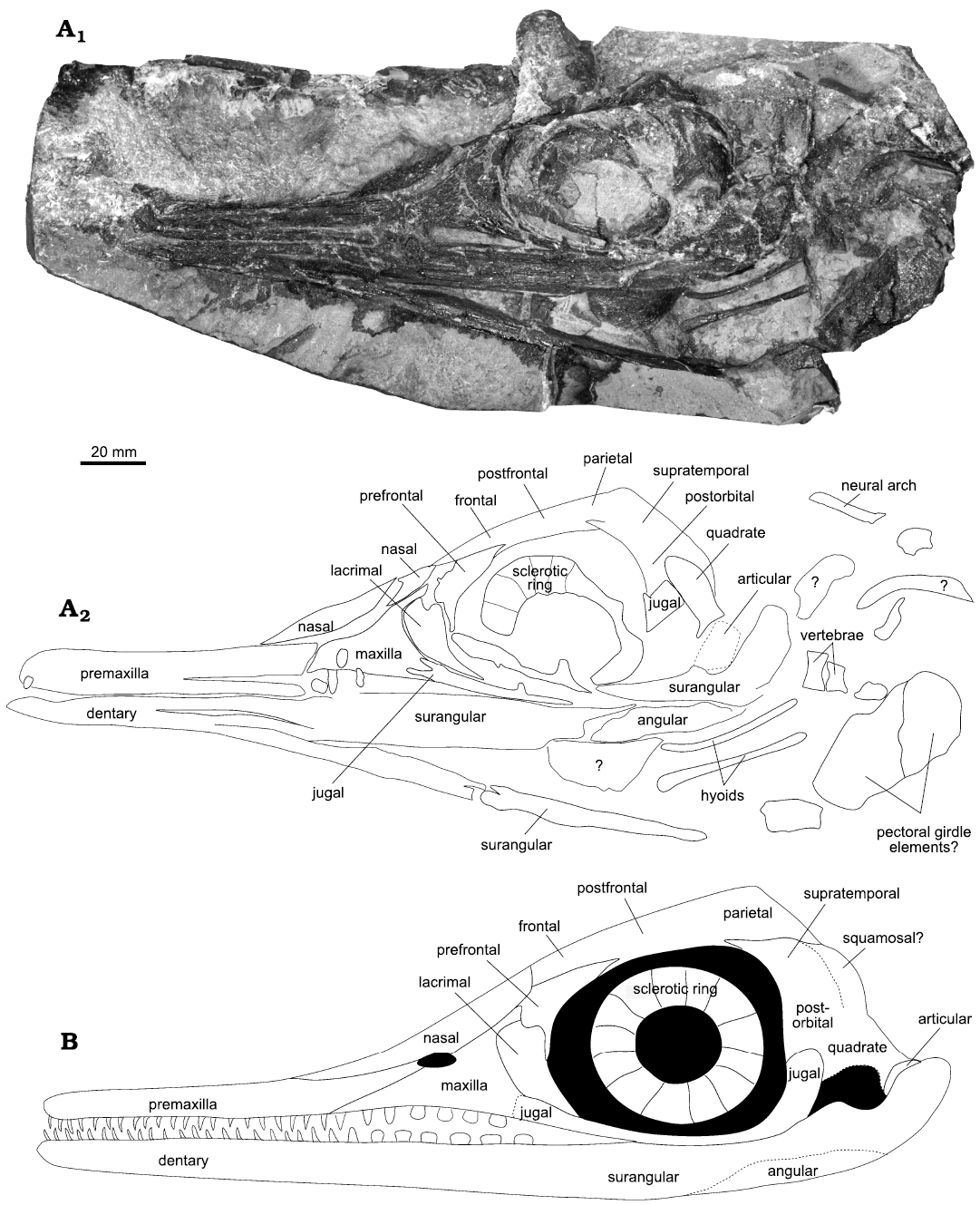
Skull of Phalarodon fraasi, showing markedly heterodont teeth

Behind the orbits, the postorbital bones contact the supratemporals, which are large in mixosaurids, as typical in Ichthyosauria. The postorbitals are blocked from the supratemporal fenestrae, however, a condition typical for ichthyosaurians. In addition to the supratemporals, mixosaurids possess two other pairs of cheek bones, the quadratojugals, squamosals, and supratemporals. Mixosaurids typically have small quadratojugals, though it is large in P. callawayi and it is possible that this is an artifact of preservation. The regions behind the orbits have concave lower edges; these concavities are prominent in mixosaurids with broad postorbital regions but very reduced in those with narrow postorbital regions. On the palate, the pterygoid bones are situated close together, enclosing only a very narrow space between them. The lower jaws of mixosaurids are long and thin, though more resistant to crushing than the crania. Some mixosaurids have prominent coronoid processes, like P. callawayi, while this region of the jaw is flat in others, such as M. cornalianus.

Mixosaurid dentition is heterodont, and among the most variable portions of mixosaurid anatomy, making it important for differentiating between species. Thin, pointed teeth line the front part of mixosaurid jaws. These teeth bear thin, weak ridges extending from the tooth's base to its point on their enamel. The back teeth are thicker than those in front, though their shape differs between species. In M. cornalianus these teeth are still fairly pointed, while they are blunt in P. atavus. Other mixosaurids have back teeth that differ more from those in front, possessing broad crushing teeth in the lower jaw, if not also the upper. These teeth are sometimes compressed from side to side, however, in P. callawayi, they are bulbous.

=== Vertebrae and ribs ===
Mixosaurids have approximately 50 vertebrae between their skull and hips. Mixosaurids have distinctively tall and thin neural spines, whose height is much greater than that of the centra (the bodies of the vertebrae). Neural spine height changes throughout the vertebral column, reaching their greatest height at the caudal peak, the point where the slope of the neural spines changes from backswept to anticlined. The tail also is bent slightly downward at this point, though much less markedly than in the parvipelvians and their relatives. The zygapophyses, pairs of interlocking projections, are strongly developed in the neck region, but are reduced further back in the trunk, if not totally lacking. The centra are amphicoelous, both their front and back faces being concave, and are also tall, being at least roughly twice as tall as long, if not even taller. This height to length ratio of the centra increases at the caudal peak, as does absolute height, typically. In the trunk region, the broad centra are weakly polygonal, while those towards the end of the tail are very narrow.

In the neck and the vicinity of the hips, there are two separate facets on each side of the vertebrae for the articulation of the ribs. The ribs in these regions are correspondingly, bicephalous, having forked heads. Elsewhere in the vertebral column, however, there is only a single articular surface for each rib, and the ribs are single-headed. Long, thin, and longitudinally grooved ribs with flattened tips are present in the trunk. The underside of the trunk sported gracile gastralia, or belly ribs, each of which have a small prong extending forwards.

=== Appendicular skeleton ===
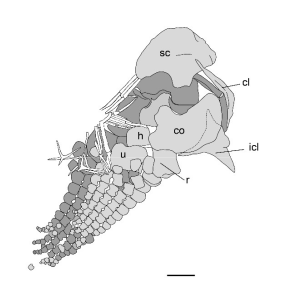
Forelimb and shoulder girdle of Mixosaurus cornalianus

The anatomy of the shoulder girdle in mixosaurids is typical of early ichthyopterygians. The scapulae are broad, semicurcular bones, with their blades resembling fans or axheads in shape, except in P. atavus, where the edge before the shoulder joint is straight. The portion of the scapula involved in the shoulder joint is small and offset from the blade. Mixosaurid coracoids are expanded into rounded, fan-like shapes as well, though the region in front of the shoulder joint is distinctively longer than the region behind the shoulder joint. Situated between the collarbones is the interclavicle, which is roughly triangular. While the edges of the bone may be bowed inwards, the overall shape is markedly different from the T-shaped interclavicles of other ichthyosaurs.

The mixosaurid humerus is short and wide, particularly so in Mixosaurus. The front margin of the humerus is drawn out into a plate-like flange. The only prominent ridge on the surface of the bone is the deltopectroal crest, which is separated from the humeral head by a notch. The bones below the humerus (the radius in front and ulna behind) are also abbreviated in length. Both the front and back sides of the radius are bowed inwards, while the ulna's rear edge is unnotched, with the exception of P. callawayi. The wrist is composed of polygonal carpals fitting firmly together, with four bones in the upper row (namely the radiale, intermedium, ulnale, and pisiform) and five bones in the lower row (distal carpals). Distal to the pisiform, many mixosaurids also have an additional, second pisiform. Of the distal carpals, the first is the largest, and is at least as large as the fifth metacarpal. The fourth distal carpal is also larger than the fifth metacarpal, except in P. atavus, which is more like earlier ichthyopterygians. The bones of the fingers, the metacarpals and phalanges, are flat and abbreviated, and unlike the carpals also have shafts, with the exception of those on the leading and trailing edges of the fin, whose outer-facing edges are often straight. Mixosaurids typically have five digits in their forelimbs, though some specimens of Phalarodon have an extra finger stemming from the pisiforms. Each digit in the mixosaurid forelimb can contain as many as ten phalanges.

Compared to the earliest ichthyopterygians, the mixosaurid pelvis is small, though it is still large compared to the extremely reduced pelves of post-Triassic ichthyosaurs. Historically, it was suggested that the upper hip bones, the ilia, articulated with the vertebral column, however, the hips of all hueneosaurs lacked attachment to spine. There are two pairs of lower hip bones, the pubic bones and ischia, the former the larger of the two, often significantly so. Each pubic bone typically bears a small opening called an obturator foramen, though it is occasionally lacking in M. cornalianus. The ischia meet each other along the midline, forming a symphysis.

Mixosaurid hindlimbs are rather small, with their length being under two thirds that of the forelimbs, a condition also seen convergently in later ichthyosaurs. The flat long bones of the hindlimb are quite short, much like those of the forelimb. The polygonal foot bones fit tightly together, with four distal tarsals (ankle bones). Typically, there are five metatarsals below them, however, some mixosaurids have only four per limb. Nevertheless, there are always five digits, which contain an increased number of bones. The front edges of the phalanges on the leading edge of the limb are notched in some mixosaurids, but flat in others.

=== Soft tissue ===
Exceptionally preserved specimens of Mixosaurus cornalianus preserve smooth, scaleless skin. These specimens also show that M. cornalianus had a dorsal fin, which was internally supported by collagen fibers and set far forwards on the body, where the trunk was deepest. The caudal peak supported the triangular upper lobe of the tail fin, similar in structure to that of the dorsal fin, with supporting fibers below the outer layer of skin. The tail fin of Mixosaurus is not crescentic, as seen in later ichthyosaurs, with the upper and lower lobes having different sizes.
