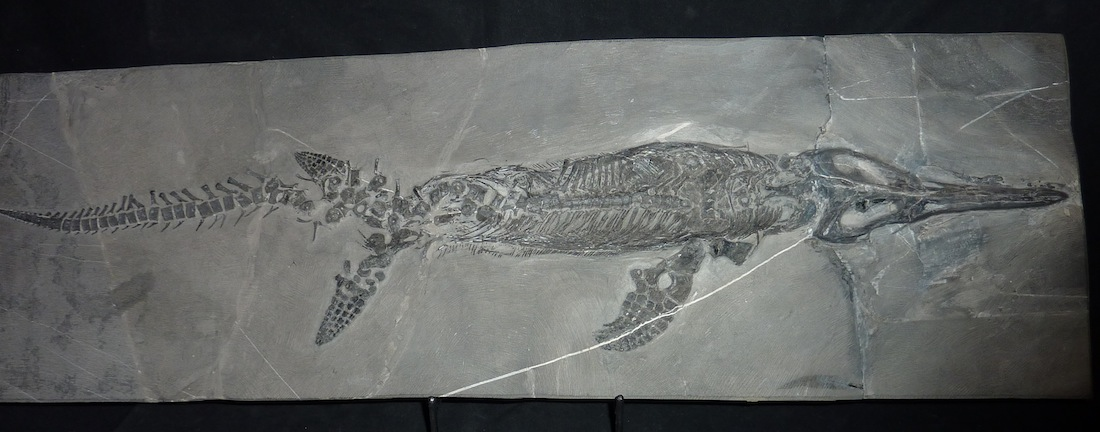
- Dorsal view of fossil showing top of skull

Scientific classification
- Kingdom: Animalia
- Phylum: Chordata
- Class: Reptilia
- Superorder: †Ichthyopterygia
- Order: †Ichthyosauria
- Family: †Mixosauridae
- Subfamily: †Mixosaurinae
- Genus: †Mixosaurus; Baur, 1887

Type species
- Mixosaurus cornalianus (Bassani, 1886)

Species
- M. cornalianus (Bassani, 1886); M. kuhnschnyderi (Brinkmann, 1998); M. luxiensis Fang, Wolniewicz & Liu, 2024; M. panxianensis? Jiang, Schmitz, Hao & Sun, 2006; M. xindianensis? Chen & Cheng, 2010; M. xinzhaiensis? Chen et al., 2016

= Mixosaurus =

Mixosaurus Temporal range: Triassic (Anisian to Ladinian, about 247–242 Mya) Anisian–Ladinian

Extinct genus of reptiles

Mixosaurus is an extinct genus of Middle Triassic (Anisian to Ladinian, about 250-240 Mya) ichthyosaur. Its fossils have been found near the Italy–Switzerland border and in South China.

The genus was named in 1887 by George H. Baur. The name means "Mixed Lizard", and was chosen because it appears to have been a transitional form between the eel-shaped ichthyosaurs such as Cymbospondylus and the later dolphin-shaped ichthyosaurs, such as Ichthyosaurus. Baur named Mixosaurus as a new genus because its forefin was sufficiently different from that of Ichthyosaurus.

Numerous species have been described within this genus, which was once considered as the most common genus of Triassic ichthyosaurs. The type species is M. cornalianus, and the definitive number of species is debated among researchers.

== Description ==
Mixosaurus with a human hand to scale

Mixosaurus was a small ichthyosaur, measuring 73–100 cm (2.40–3.28 ft) long and weighing 2.2–5.7 kg (4.9–12.6 lb). The largest specimens would have measured over 2 m (6.6 ft) in length. It possessed a long tail with a low fin, suggesting it wasn't as fast as Jurassic Ichthyosaurs, but also possessed a dorsal fin for stability in the water. The paddle-like limbs were made up of five toes each, unlike the three toes found in later Ichthyosaurs. Noteworthy, however, is that each toe had more individual bones than is usual in reptiles, and the front limbs were longer than the back limbs, both adaptations typical of later ichthyosaurs. The jaws were narrow, with several sharp teeth, that would have been ideal for catching fish. They had relatively large skulls compared to their bodies, unlike the basal ichthyosaurs, but resembled fish-shaped ichthyosaurs that appeared later. They had around 50 vertebrae in front of the pelvic girdle, around twice as many as terrestrial diapsids. Recent studies suggest that genus Mixosaurus may have lived near shore or in a shelf-like habitat as it possesses more compact spongy bone within its long bones than other Ichthyosaurs.

== Species ==
A 2024 study which described the new species M. luxiensis showed that the identity of species within Mixosaurus is debated among researchers except for M. cornalianus and M. kuhnschnyderi. M. xindianensis has been suggested as species inquirenda, and it may more likely belong to Phalarodon. Known species of Mixosaurus share many similar characteristics throughout the cranial and post cranial with the main differences morphology occurring in the dental region. Examples of the dental variation are the extent of the dental groove in the upper jaw, the shape and size of the teeth and the number of rows of teeth

Previous authors assigned other species to the genus, including M. atavus (Quenstedt, 1852), M. callawayi Schmitz et al., 2004, M. panxianensis Jiang et al., 2006 and M. yangjuanensis Liu & Yin, 2008. These are now included in Contectopalatus, Phalarodon, Barracudasauroides and Nothosaurus, respectively.

Mixosaurus species declared as nomina dubia, meaning the description was insufficient to fully classify them as species, are M. maotaiensis, M. helveticus, M. timorensis, M. major, and M. nordenskioeldii.

=== Mixosaurus cornalianus ===
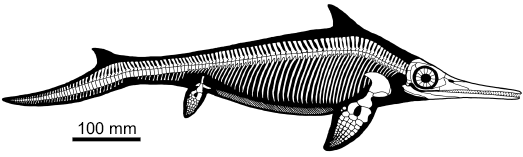
Skeletal reconstruction of M. cornalianus showing soft tissue outline

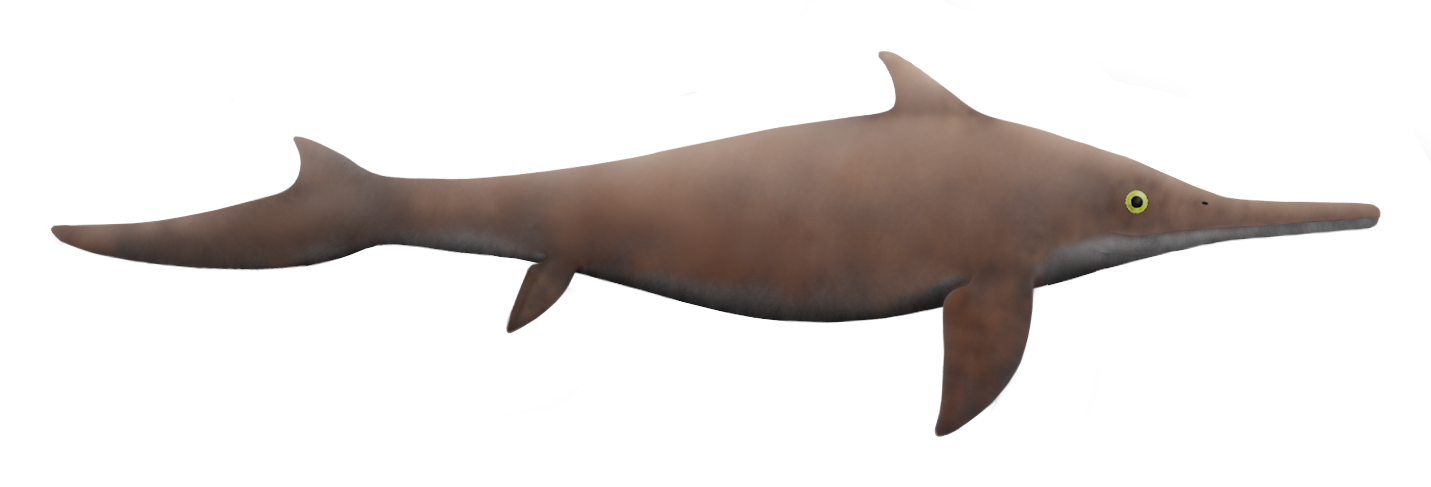
Life restoration of M. cornalianus

Many specimens of M. cornalianus have been found from the Middle Triassic of Monte San Giorgio and the Tessin areas on the border of Italy and Switzerland. M. cornalianus is the only Triassic ichthyosaur for which completely articulated skeletons have been found. Many specimens have been collected, but M. cornalianus is not well studied because all of the known specimens have been compressed during the preservation process. M. cornalianus has a sagittal crest associated with the expansion of the upper temporal fenestra. This indicates that it had exceptionally strong jaw muscles. The current name-bearing specimen is the neotype (PIMUZ T 2420), which was approved by the ICZN in 2001 after a 1999 petition.

=== Mixosaurus luxiensis ===
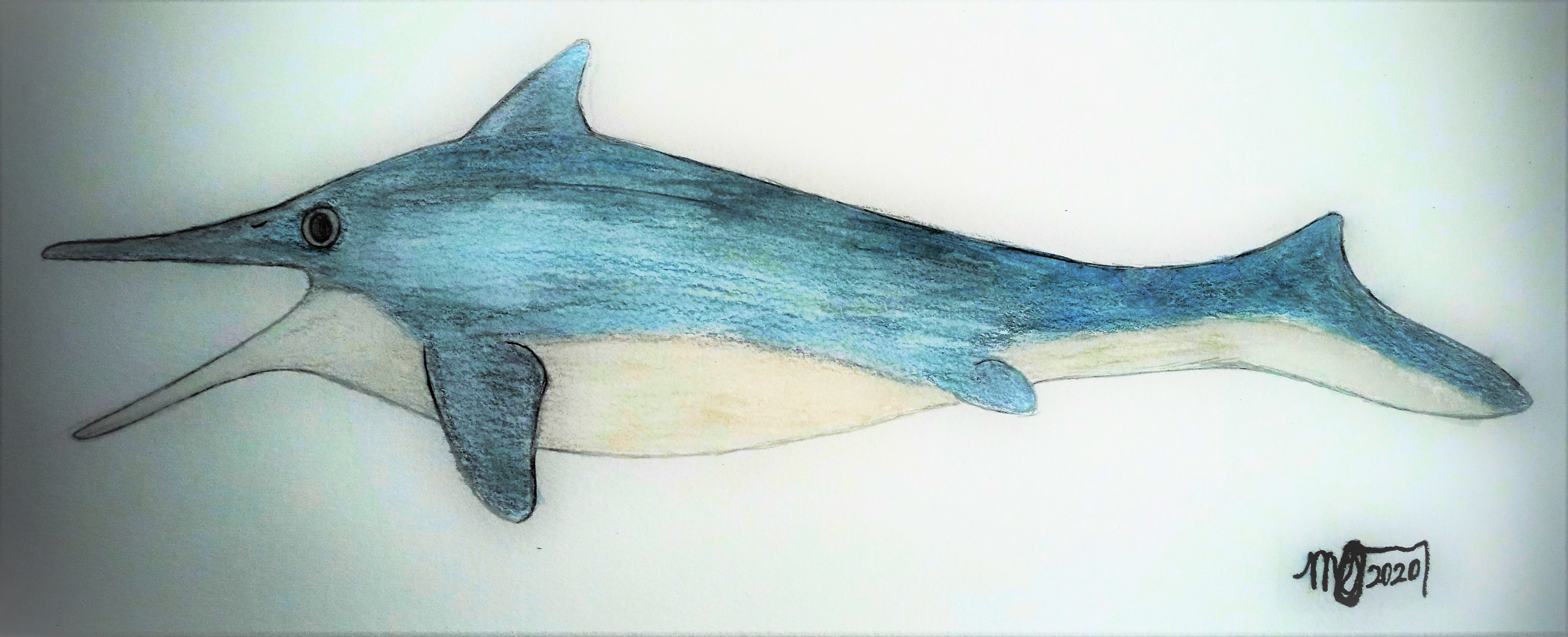
Life restoration of M. luxiensis

In 2024, Ye-Wei Fang and coauthors named a new species, M. luxiensis, with HFUT HL-21-08-002 being the holotype and only known specimen. This specimen, a largely complete but disarticulated skeleton, was found in the Upper Member of the Guanling Formation in Luxi County, Yunnan Province, China; the species name refers to this county.

=== Mixosaurus panxianensis ===
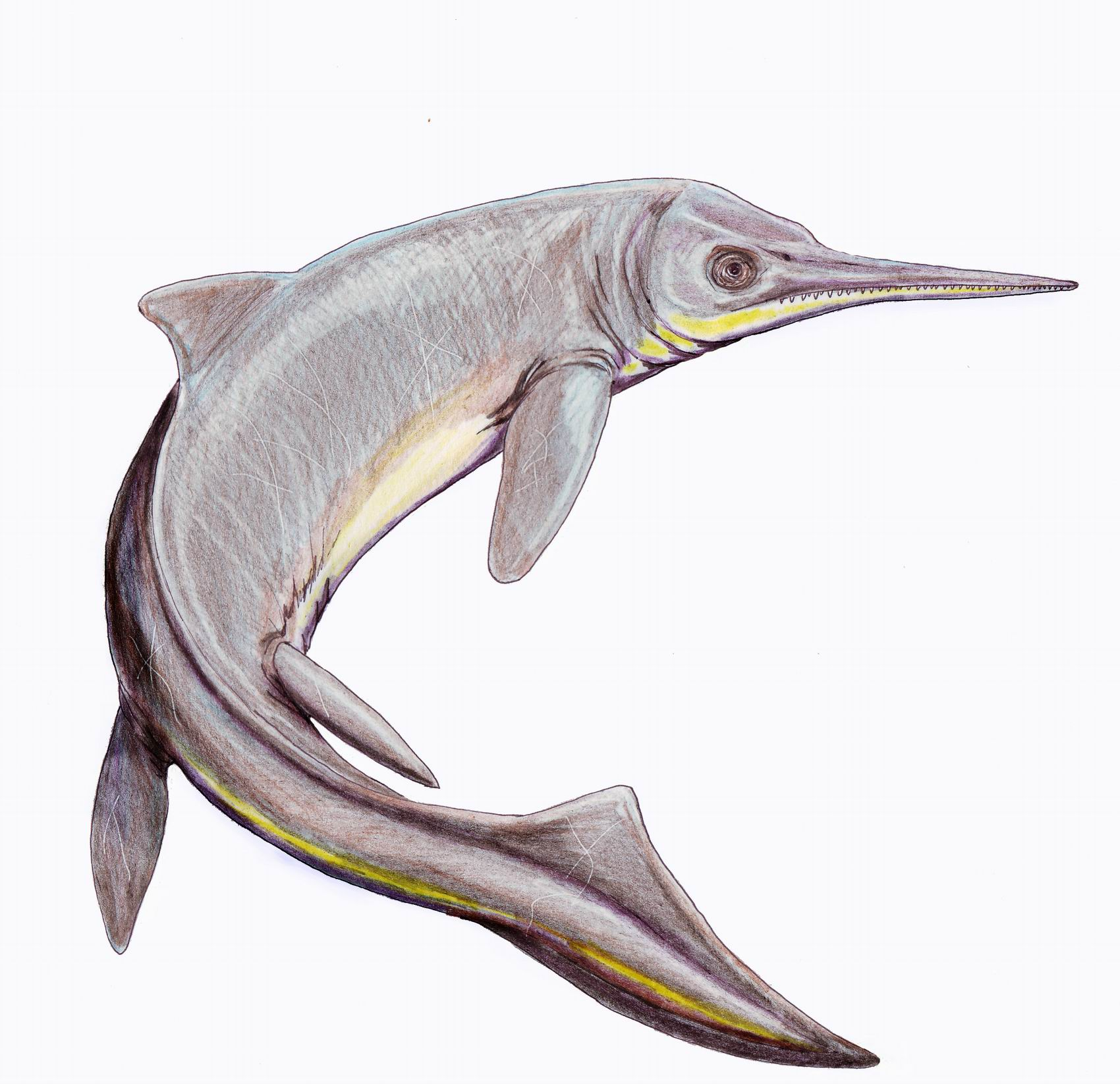
Life restoration of M. panxianensis

M. panxianensis was discovered in the Middle Triassic of the Guizhou Province, China. The specimens have been found in the Guanling Formation, which consists of thinly bedded bituminous limestones and marls. The specimens found have important mixosaurid characteristics such as a long sagittal crest along the top of the skull but is seen as a different species because there is no external contact between the jugal and the quadratojugal. Articulated skeletons have been found and the centra of the vertebrae are higher than they are long. This is evidence for its transitional position between basal early Triassic ichthyosaurs and more derived Jurassic and Cretaceous species; who have disc shaped circular centra of the vertebrae. This species has been moved to its own genus, Barracudasauroides. The 2024 study included M. panxianensis as a species of Mixosaurus based on phylogenetic analyses.

== Classification ==
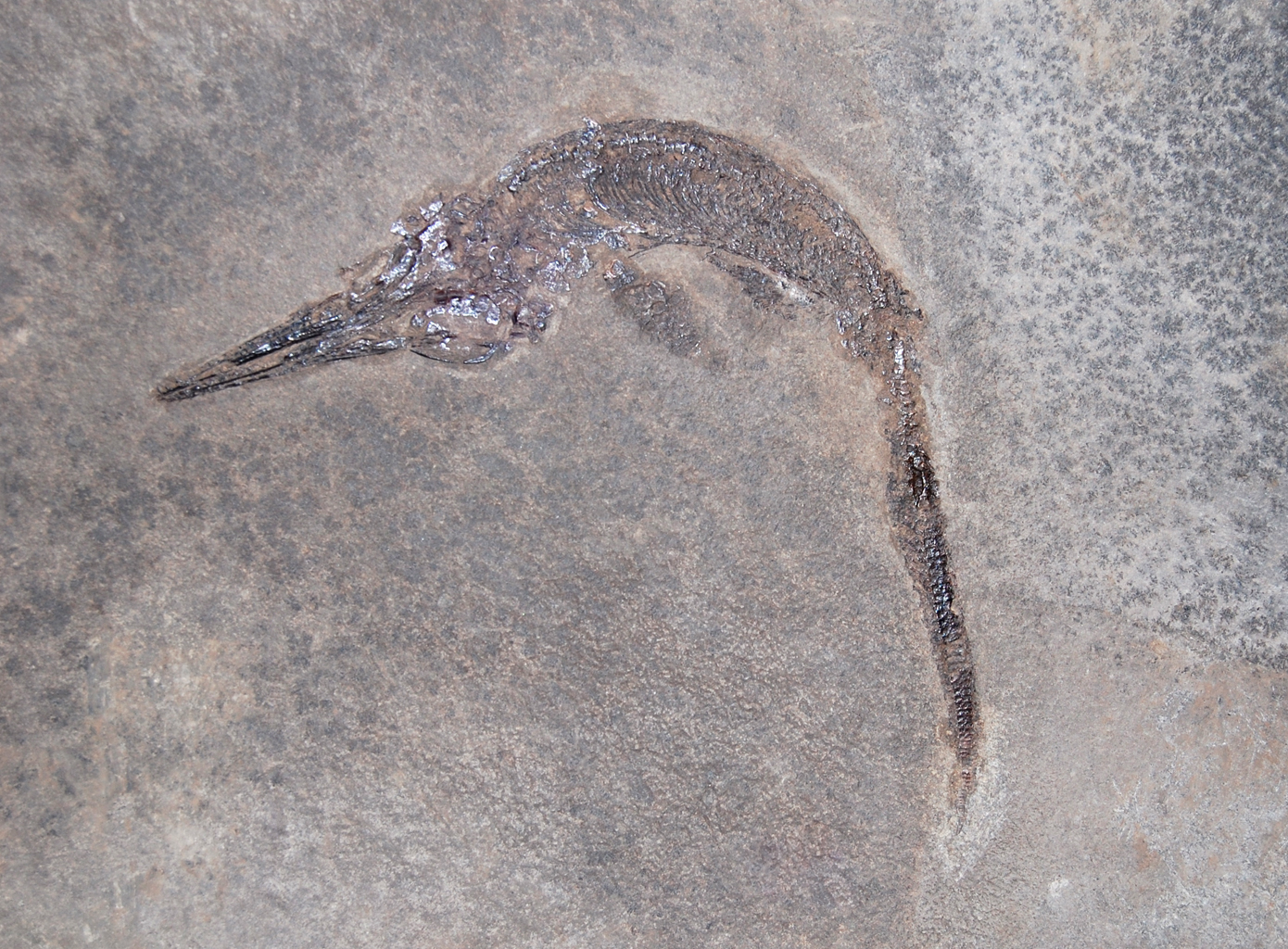
M. cornalianus in Milan

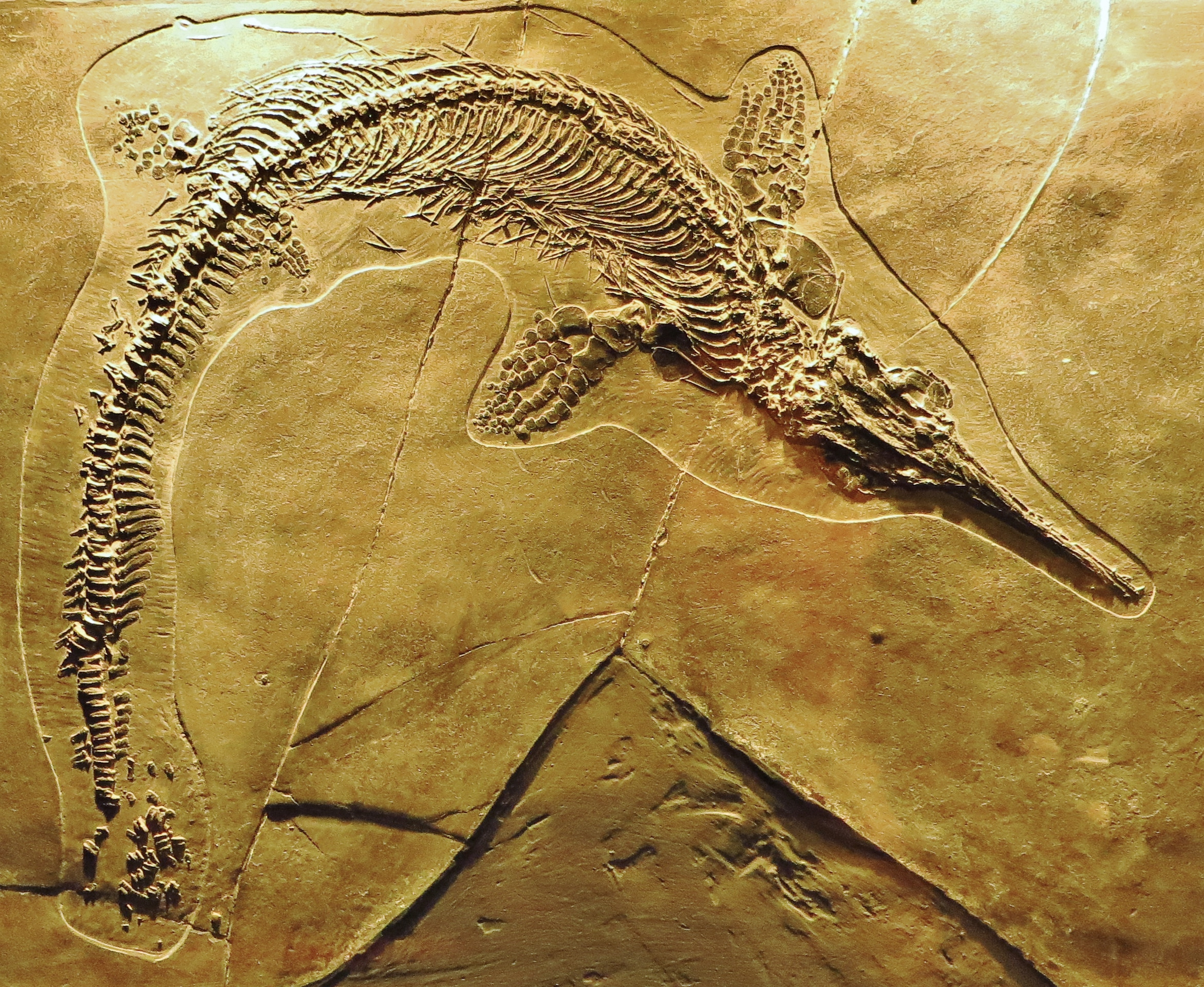
M. cornalianus

In recent years the taxonomy and phylogeny of mixosaurid ichthyosaurs has been a controversial topic. Most recently, Mixosauridae has been separated into Mixosaurinae and the sister group Phalarondontinae. Mixosaurus contains M. cornalianus, M. kuhnschnyderi and M. xindianensis, Barracudasauroides contains B. panxianensis, Phalarodon contains P. fraasi and P. callawayi, and Contectopalatus contains C. atavus.

Mixosaurids are characterised by a relatively short and wide humerus and Phalarodon are characterised by the lack of a dental groove in the upper jaw. Phalarodon fossils are found in every major Mixosaur locality.

It was suggested that Tholodus schmidi should be included in Mixosauridae but only dental material has been found so it is difficult to assign it to a genus.

Cladogram following Jiang and colleagues, 2006.

- - - Mixosaurus panxianensis
    - - Mixosaurus cornalianus
      - Mixosaurus kuhnschnyderi
  - - Phalarodon atavus
    - - Phalarodon fraasi
      - Phalarodon callawayi

Cladogram following the preferred tree of Moon, 2017.

- - Barracudasauroides panxianensis
  - - Mixosaurus xindianensis
    - Phalarodon fraasi
    - - Contectopalatus atavus
      - Phalarodon callawayi
    - - Mixosaurus cornalianus
      - Mixosaurus kuhnschnyderi

== See also ==
- List of ichthyosaurs
- Timeline of ichthyosaur research
