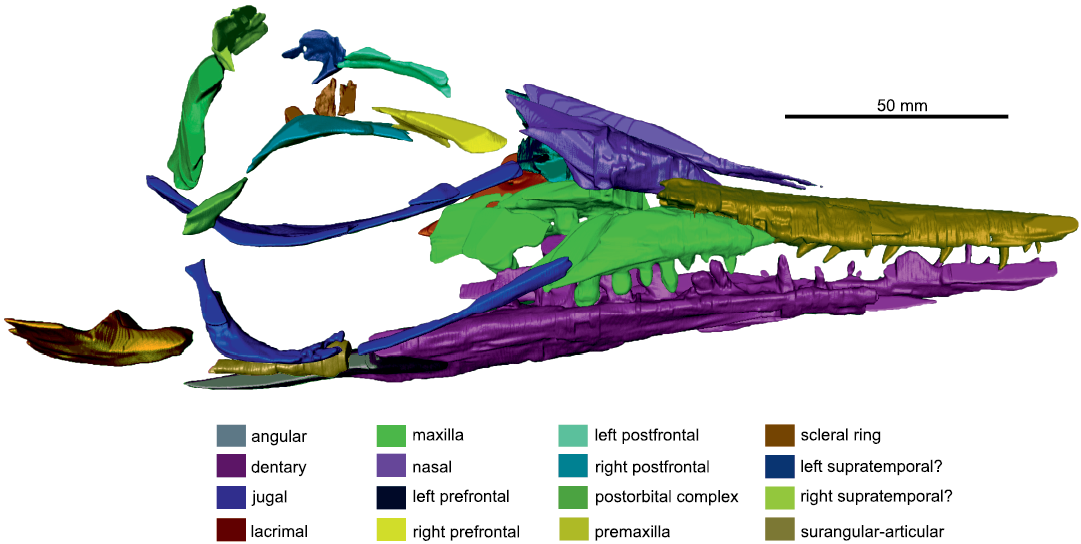
- 3D model of a Phalarodon fraasi skull (PMO 235.393)

Scientific classification
- Kingdom: Animalia
- Phylum: Chordata
- Class: Reptilia
- Superorder: †Ichthyopterygia
- Order: †Ichthyosauria
- Family: †Mixosauridae
- Genus: †Phalarodon; Merriam, 1910

Type species
- †Phalarodon fraasi Merriam, 1910

Other Species
- †Phalarodon atavus Quenstedt 1852; †Phalarodon callawayi Schmitz, 2004

Synonyms
- List: Ichthyosaurus atavus Quenstedt 1852; Ichthyosaurus nordenskioeldii Hulke, 1873; Mixosaurus nordenskioeldii Hulke, 1873; Phalarodon nordenskioeldii Hulke, 1873; Contectopalatus atavus Maisch & Matzke, 1998; Phalarodon major Maisch & Matzke, 2000; Mixosaurus atavus Schmitz et al., 2004

= Phalarodon =

Phalarodon Temporal range: Triassic, 247.2–242.0 Ma

Extinct genus of reptiles

Phalarodon is an extinct genus of mixosaurid ichthyosaur known from the Middle Triassic (247.2-242.0 million years ago). Its name is derived from the Greek φάλαρα (phálara) ("boss on the cheek plate of a helmet") and odon ("tooth"). The genus has had a tumultuous history since its classification in 1910, with different workers describing species under different genera or declaring the genus to be a nomen dubium. Currently three species are recognized, but more have been identified in the past.

== Discovery and history ==
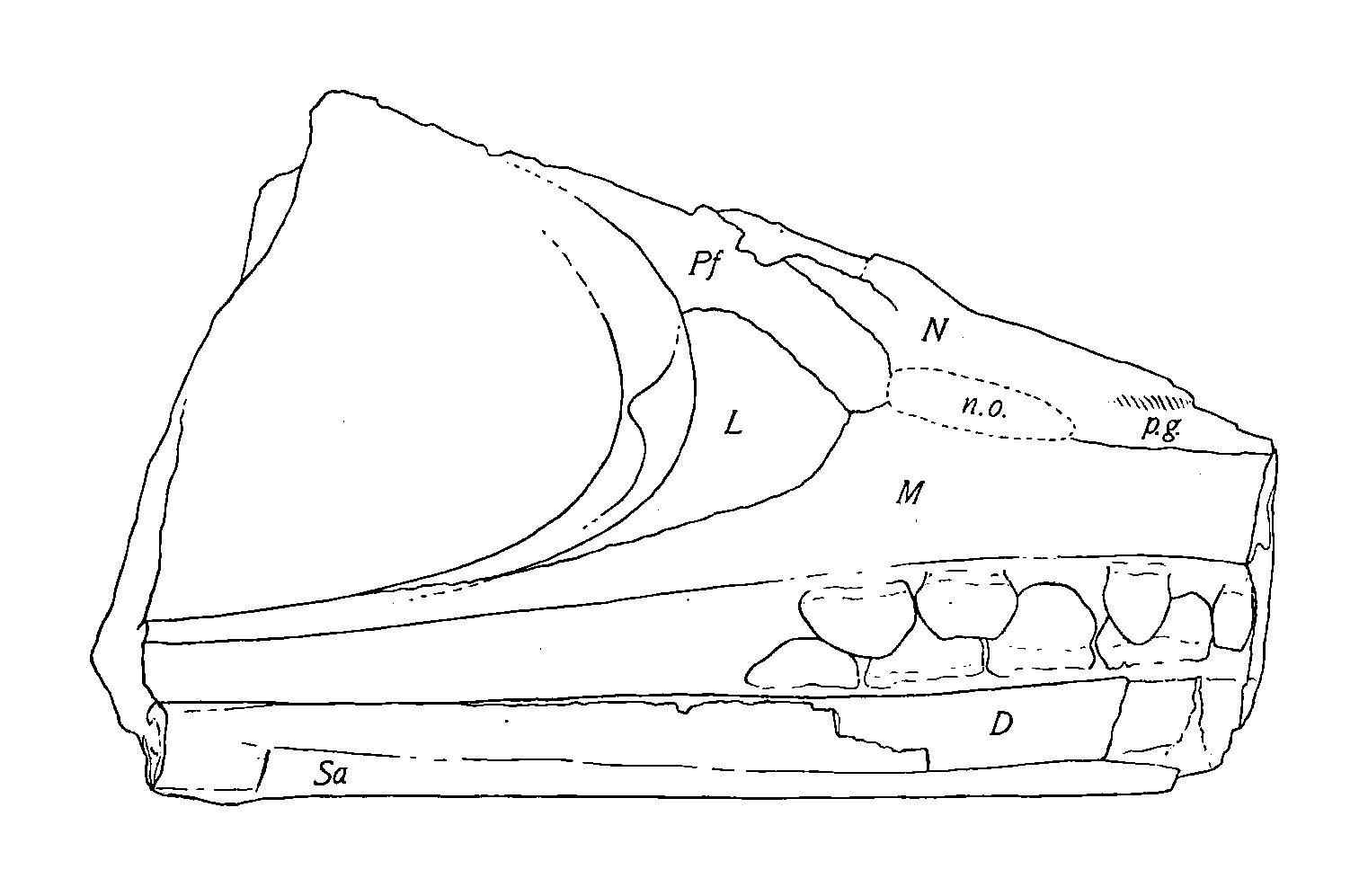
Holotype skull of P. fraasi seen from the side

The holotype of Phalarodon fraasi, which consisted of a skull and several jaw fragments, was collected by John Campbell Merriam from Fossil Hill in the West Humboldt Range of Nevada, and was subsequently described by Merriam in 1910. Since then, the species has also been found in the Guizhou Province of China, as well as the Botneheia Formation on the islands of Svalbard in Norway. In 2004, a reanalysis of the available mixosaurid materials saw Phalarodon fraasi be merged into the genus Mixosaurus alongside several other species of mixosaurid ichthyosaur.

Phalarodon atavus, from the Lower Muschelkalk of Althengstett, Germany, was originally described as Ichthyosaurus atavus by Quenstedt in 1852, from the Middle Triassic of Germany and China. In 1998, reanalysis of the type material found it to be undiagnostic, resulting in a neotype being designated and subsequently described as a new genus, Contectopalatus. Further analyses would see both the rejection of the neotype, and the merging of both Phalarodon and Contectopalatusinto the genus Mixosaurus. This change in taxonomy would be later overturned, albeit with the merge of Phalarodonand Contectopalatus being maintained. Additional specimens of Phalarodon atavus have been found in Middle Triassic Luoping Biota of Yunnan, China.

Phalarodon callawayi, from the Fossil Hill member of the Favret Formation in the Augusta Mountains of Nevada, was originally described as Mixosaurus callawayi before being reclassified as a species of Phalarodon. This species is also known from Svalbard and British Columbia.

Additional species of Phalarodon have been identified throughout history, but only the three listed here are currently considered valid. A possible specimen identified as Phalarodon sp. was discovered from the Besano Formation of Switzerland.

== Description ==
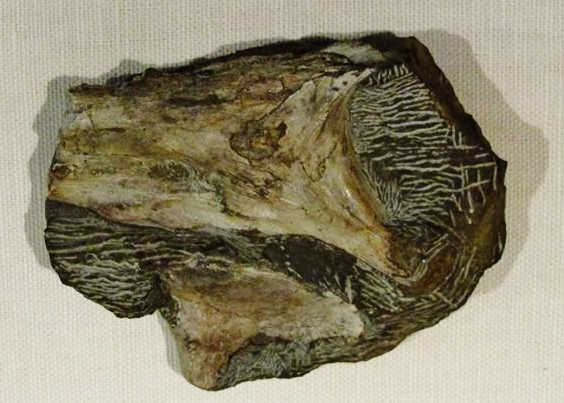
A specimen of Phalarodon atavus from Germany.

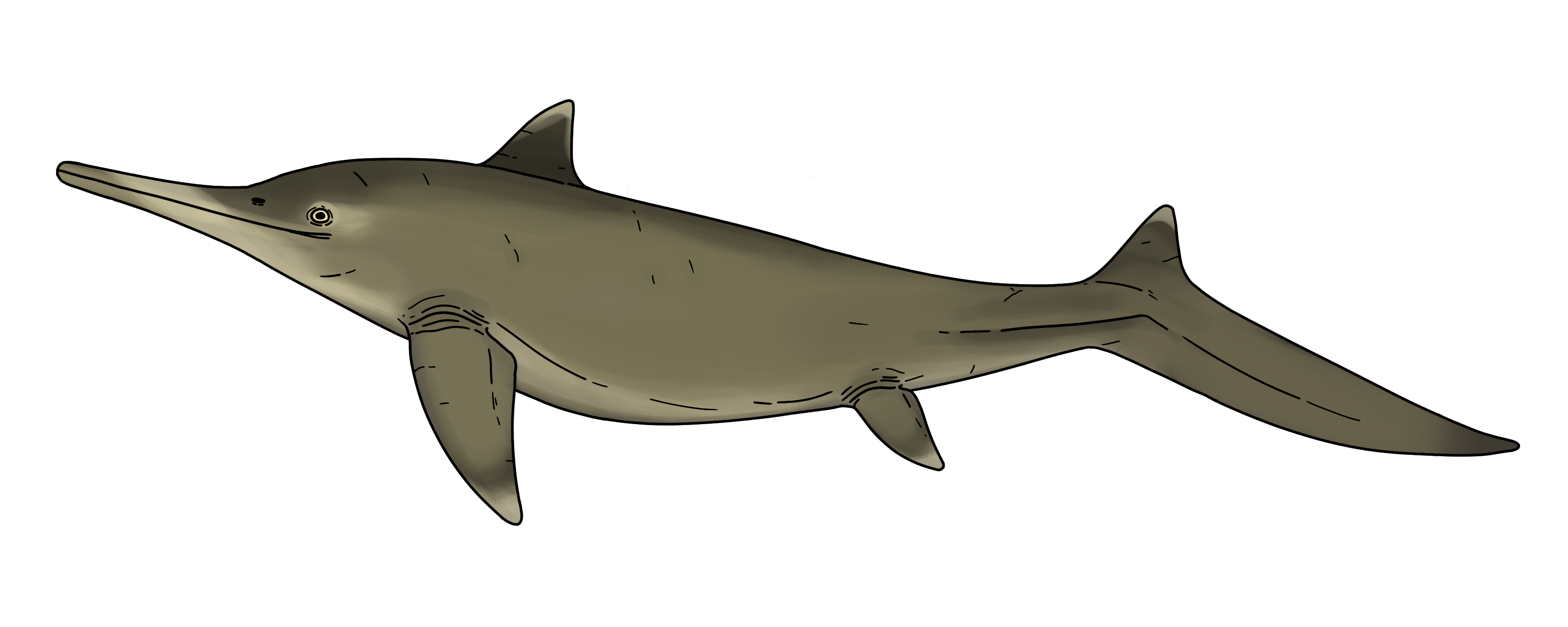
Restoration of P. atavus

Phalarodon had a body plan typical of mixosaurs, being relatively elongate in comparison to later Jurassic ichthyosaur forms. Many specimens consist only of cranial material, meaning that many of the autapomorphies of Phalarodon are based on the morphology of the skull and jaw. These include the parietal forming a significant portion of the sagittal crest, the absence of a dental groove in the maxilla, and a nasal region with a pronounced narial shelf. Given that not all species possess the same degree of postcranial preservation, few characteristic from this region have been defined, but proposed defining features include an elongated humerus (not preserved in Phalarodon atavus) and fifth metacarpal notched along the anterior edge (not preserved in Phalarodon callawayi).

In 2000, Maisch and Matzke noted that Contectopalatus (now P. atavus) was a large mixosaurid, calculating a skull length of 40 centimetres (1 ft 4 in). Based on jaw fragments, they estimated another specimen they assigned to the species to have been even larger, with a skull length of 70–80 centimetres (2.3–2.6 ft) and a total length of roughly 4.5–5 metres (15–16 ft). McGowan and Motani (2003), however, considered these estimates to be based on material to fragmentary for confident estimation and taxonomic assignment, instead considering the species to be a small mixosaurid, like the roughly 1 metre (3.3 ft) long Mixosaurus cornalianus.

== Paleobiology ==
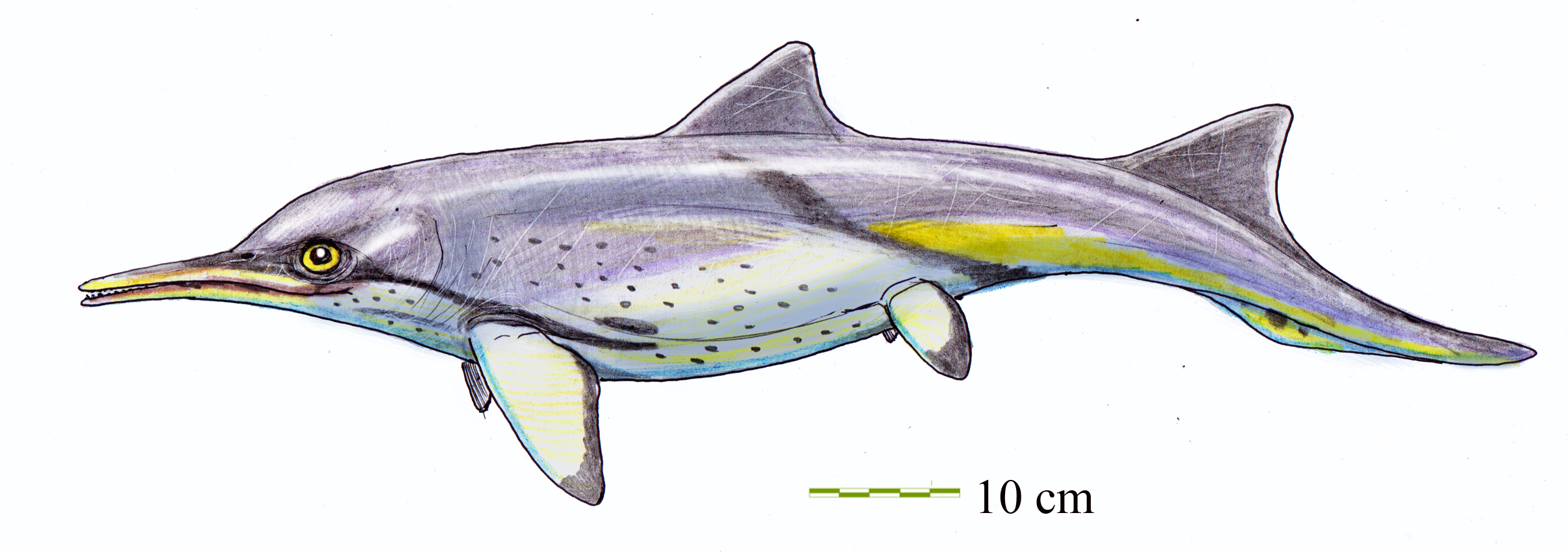
Life restoration

In 2000, it was found that Phalarodon atavus (then Contectopalatus atavus) possessed a skull morphology indicative of a strong bite. This conclusion aligns with the unique teeth observed in the species, implying that Phalarodon atavus, and other mixosaurids, were highly specialized for particularly dietary niches. Conclusions such as this are typically difficult to reach given that most ichthyosaur remains are functionally preserved in two dimensions.

A well preserved specimen of Phalarodon atavus from China has demonstrated that the species would have been an adept swimmer, capable of traversing the Tethyan ocean, as evidenced by the presence of the species in both Germany and China, which were located on opposite coasts of the Tethyan ocean.

Both being found within the Fossil Hill Member of the Favert Formation, Phalarodon callawayi and Phalarodon fraasi would have not only shared an ecosystem with each other, but also with several other species of marine reptiles, including the ichthyosaurs Cymbospondylus and Omphalosaurus, as well as the sauropterygian Augustasaurus.

== See also ==
- List of ichthyosaurs
- Timeline of ichthyosaur research
