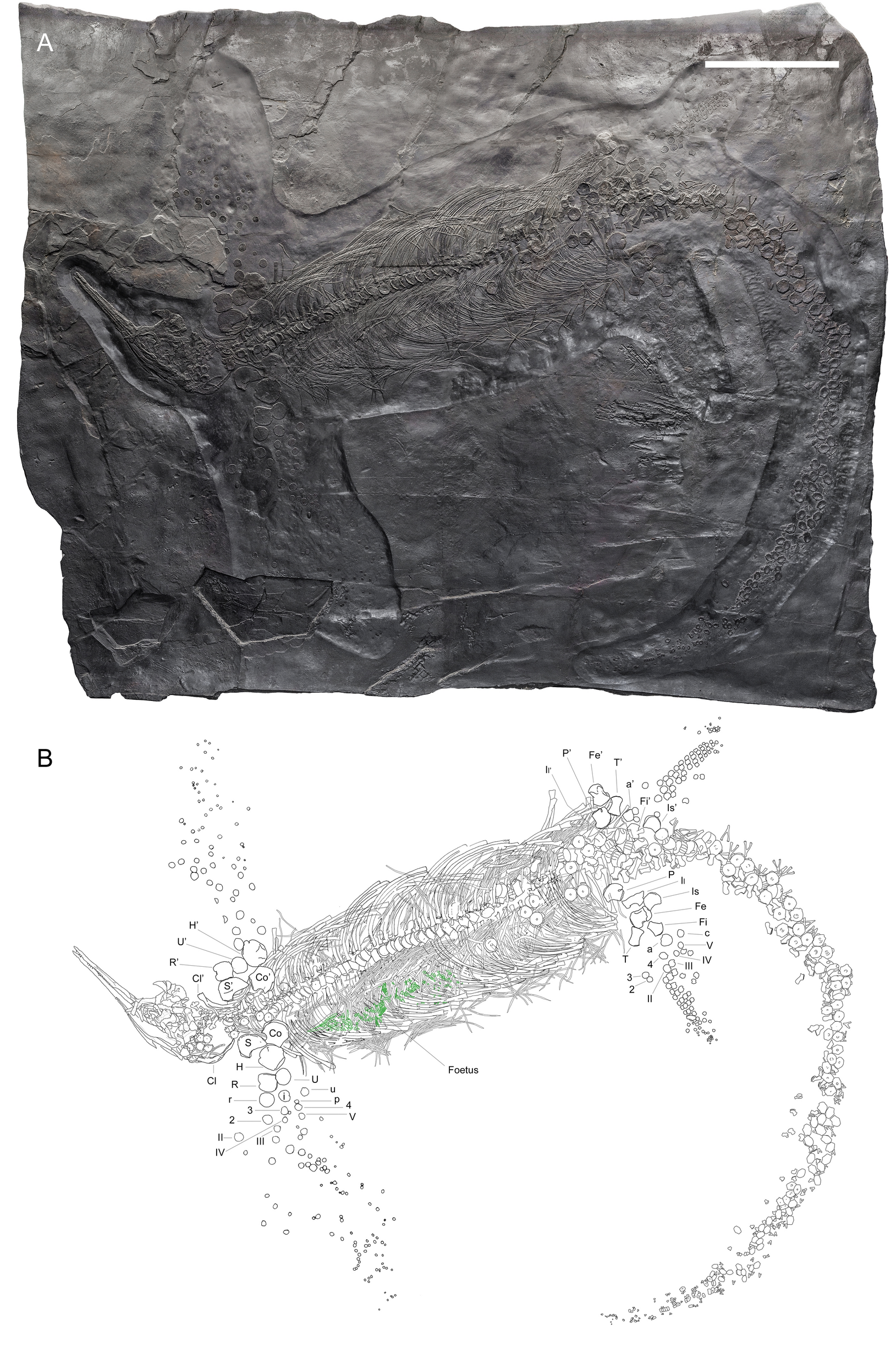
- Cast of BES SC 999, the holotype (top) and interpretative drawing (bottom)

Scientific classification
- Kingdom: Animalia
- Phylum: Chordata
- Class: Reptilia
- Order: †Ichthyosauria
- Family: †Shastasauridae
- Genus: †Besanosaurus; Dal Sasso & Pinna, 1996

Type species
- †Besanosaurus leptorhynchus Dal Sasso & Pinna, 1996

Synonyms
- Mikadocephalus gracilirostris Maisch & Matzke, 1997

= Besanosaurus =

Besanosaurus Temporal range: Middle Triassic, latest Anisian, 244–242 Ma

Genus of Triassic ichthyosaur

Besanosaurus (meaning 'reptile from Besano') is an extinct genus of Middle Triassic ichthyosaur from Monte San Giorgio of Italy and Switzerland, containing the single species B. leptorhynchus. Besanosaurus was named by Cristiano Dal Sasso and Giovanni Pinna in 1996, based on the nearly complete flattened skeleton BES SC 999, the holotype specimen. This skeleton is preserved across multiple thin rock slabs spanning 3.5 by 4 metres (11 by 13 ft) when assembled and took thousands of hours to prepare. Additional specimens from Monte San Giorgio that have previously been considered separate genera, including a partial skull named Mikadocephalus and a well-preserved, largely complete skeleton, have been reinterpreted as additional specimens of Besanosaurus. Putative specimens have been discovered in the Norwegian archipelago of Svalbard and Germany, although their attribution to the genus remains disputed.

As an ichthyosaur, Besanosaurus had flippers for limbs and a fin on the tail. Besanosaurus is a large ichthyosaur, with the largest known specimen estimated to measure about 8 metres (26 ft) long. It has a long, slender body with a small head and long tail. The snout of Besanosaurus is long and thin, and contains numerous small pointed teeth. In the upper jaw, the teeth are mostly set into sockets but the rearmost teeth are implanted in a groove. The lower jaw bears enlarged coronoid processes for the anchorage of jaw muscles. There are 61 vertebrae in front of the hips, two in the hip region, and at least 138 in the tail. The tail made up more than half the animal's length and displays a downward bend. The forelimbs are longer than the hindlimbs, and the humeri are round and squat. The phalanges (finger and toe bones) are elliptical in the forelimbs but constricted in the hindlimbs.

While it is understood to be a shastasaurid-type ichthyosaur, how exactly Besanosaurus and other members of this group are related to each other is unclear. The skull bones of Besanosaurus indicate that it would have possessed strong jaw muscles, but its delicate snout suggests it would have fed on small fish and coleoid cephalopods, which it could have caught with rapid, snapping bites. Ichthyosaurs gave birth to live young, and the holotype contain the remains of an embryo in its chest cavity. All definite specimens of Besanosaurus come from the Besano Formation. During the Anisian, this region was a lagoon populated by a wide variety of marine life, including a variety of other ichthyosaurs. These different ichthyosaurs are thought to have used different feeding strategies to avoid competition.

== History of study ==
=== Holotype and naming ===
In 1985, paleontological work began at a site known as Sasso Caldo (meaning 'warm stone') on the Italian side of Monte San Giorgio. This site is located about 800 metres (2,600 ft) above sea level, and was fairly easy to reach. The rocks of this quarry were unmodified by faulting and consisted of layers of oil shale and dolomite pertaining to the geological unit known as the Besano Formation. The excavation at Sasso Caldo is the longest-lasting excavation that was conducted at Monte San Giorgio, and was part of an operation organized by the Milan Natural History Museum, with the excavation performed by the Gruppo Paleontologico di Besano, a volunteer group. In the spring of 1993, while extracting a block of dolomite containing the skeletons of a pair of mixosaurid ichthyosaurs, a piece of shale from the layer below broke loose. Preserved within this piece of shale from bituminous level n. 65 were the parts of the jaws of a large ichthyosaur. The rest of the skeleton of this ichthyosaur was extracted through the following summer by collecting the entire rock layer it was preserved in. The shale was exposed by using sledgehammers, wedges, and a jackhammer to clear out the dolomite above it, then divided into slabs and extracted with less forceful tools. Being rather fragile, the shale often broke during the excavation.

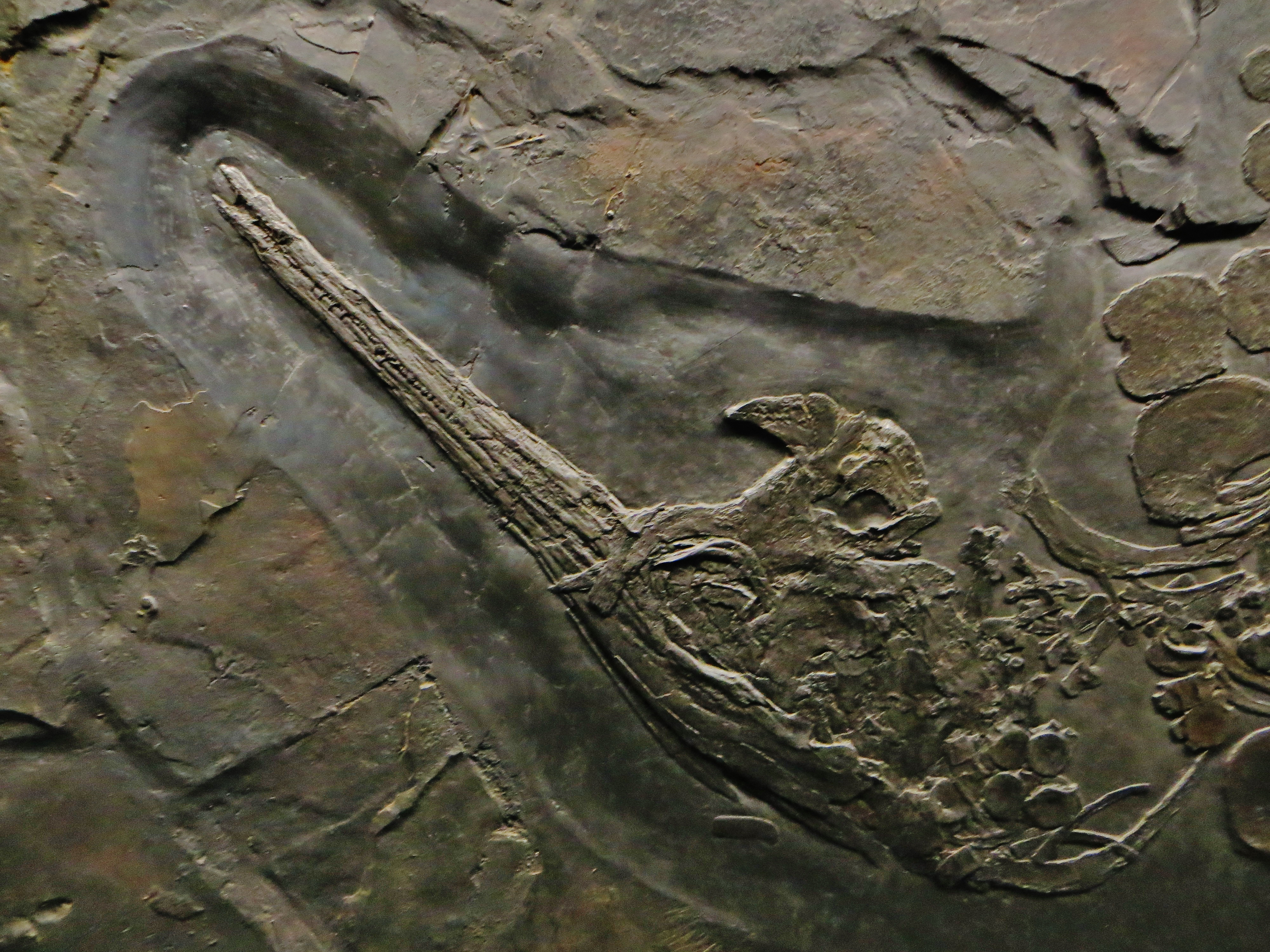
Skull and front part of the skeleton of BES SC 999, the holotype of Besanosaurus

The large ichthyosaur skeleton was deposited in the Milan Natural History Museum, where it was given the specimen number BES SC 999. To determine the extent of the skeleton, the museum collaborated with a hospital in the city to scan the slabs using X-ray analysis. Each radiogram covered an area of 35 by 45 centimetres (14 by 18 in), and 145 were needed to show the entire specimen, which was ultimately revealed to be spread across a total of 33 slabs. While the slabs are only about 2.7 centimetres (1.1 in) thick, when put together, they cover an area of about 3.5 by 4 metres (11 by 13 ft). The skeleton is flattened from top to bottom, with the exception of the skull, which was instead crushed flat from side to side to a thickness of under 1 centimetre (0.39 in). Most disarticulation of the skeleton is fairly minimal, though the bones of the fingers are scattered. The slabs contain an additional small mixosaurid as well as the large ichthyosaur.

By February 1996, 2500 hours of preparation had been performed by three or four preparators on the specimen, exposing the skull and appendicular skeleton. While the preparation was not yet complete, a preliminary report on this large ichthyosaur by Cristiano Dal Sasso and Giovanni Pinna was published later that year, the authors considering it warranted by the skeleton's distinctiveness and completeness, with the unprepared portions of the skeleton studied through radiography. Dal Sasso and Pinna found the specimen to differ from other shastasaurs, and made it the holotype of a new genus and species, Besanosaurus leptorhynchus. The genus name means 'reptile from Besano', referencing a village in Varese Province, Lombardy, while the Greek words leptòs for 'thin' or 'slender' and rhynchos for 'snout' make up the species name. The authors stated that a more detailed study could be produced once preparation was finished, a task they predicted could take as long as 8000 more hours. It ultimately took 16500 hours spread over 5 years in total to fully reveal the skeleton, which was concealed under 21,000 square centimetres (3,300 sq in) of rock. The holotype subsequently entered storage as a total of 25 slabs, while a cast of the entire specimen put on display in 1999. BES SC 999 remains the most complete specimen of Besanosaurus. While P. Martin Sander and Christiane Faber in 1998 considered it possible that Besanosaurus represented another specimen of the related Shastasaurus, Besanosaurus has otherwise been accepted as a valid taxon.

=== Further specimens and Mikadocephalus ===
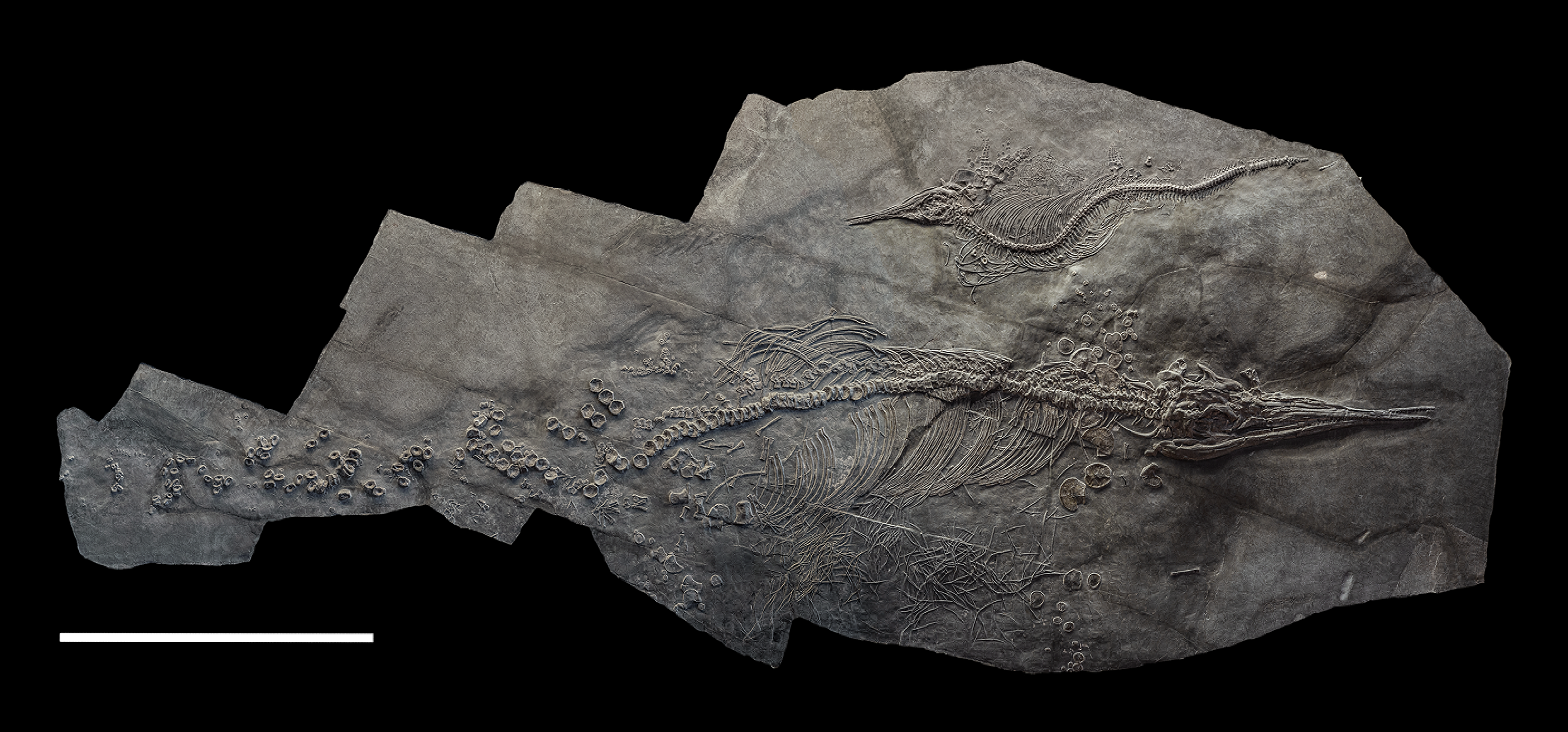
Referred specimen PIMUZ T 4376, together with a Mixosaurus (top) preserved on the same slab

The holotype of Besanosaurus was not the first shastasaur known from Monte San Giorgio. Two shastasaurid specimens from Switzerland were deposited in the collections of Paläontologisches Institut und Museum der Universität Zürich in the 1920s, both of them being mentioned in passing in the literature of the century. The smaller of the two, numbered PIMUZ T 4376, is a skeleton with a somewhat articulated skull and trunk but disarticulated limbs and tail. While the tail is missing its end the specimen is otherwise nearly complete, and the preservation of the bones is good. This specimen was recovered from layer 71 in the Valle Stelle mine. The other specimen, hailing from layer 116 of the Cava Tre Fontane mine, is cataloged as PIMUZ T 4847 and is very large, and poorly preserved and disarticulated, missing the tail and limbs. Sander and Jean Michel Mazin considered both of these specimens to represent a distinct genera in 1993. The medium-sized specimen was studied by David Cook, who had an abstract published in 1994, in which this specimen was interpreted as pertaining to a new genus. Dal Sasso and Pinna considered this specimen similar to Californosaurus and proportionally distinct from Besanosaurus in their description of the latter genus, following discussion with Robert Appleby. However, Cook's study of PIMUZ T 4376 did not lead to a paper, and the specimen remained incompletely known.

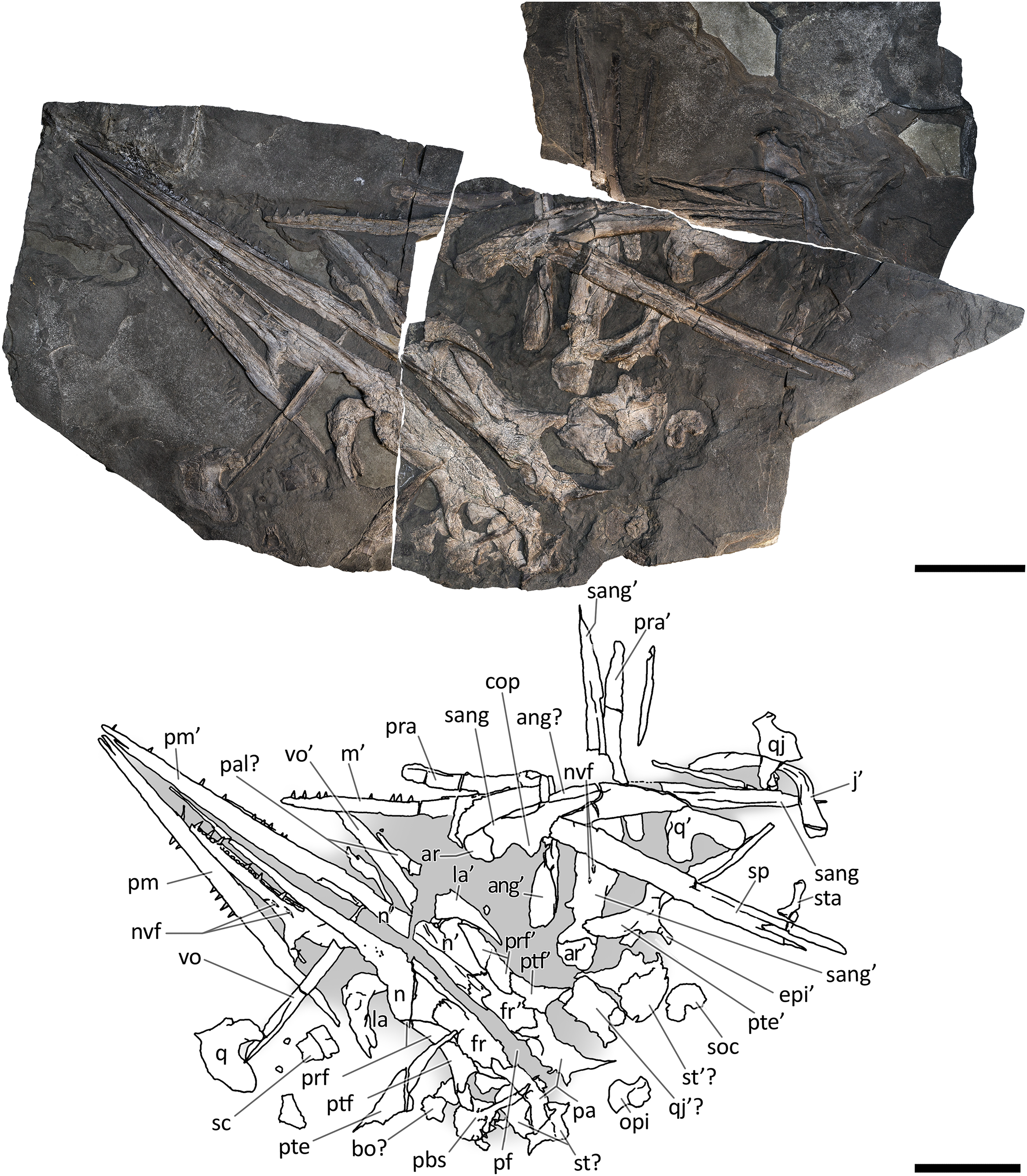
Disarticulated skull GPIT 1793/1, the holotype specimen of Mikadocephalus gracilirostris

In 1997, Michael Maisch and Andreas Matzke described an ichthyosaur skull housed at the Palaeontological Collection of Tübingen University, cataloged as GPIT 1793/1. This specimen comes from an unknown position in the Besano Formation in Switzerland. This skull is preserved on three shale slabs, and detailed preparation work was done using air abrasion by Fritz Lörcher. While the individual bones are generally fairly well preserved, the skull overall is crushed and strongly disarticulated. Determining it distinct after exhaustive comparisons with other ichthyosaurs, Maisch and Matzke named it the holotype of a new genus and species, Mikadocephalus gracilirostris. The genus name comes from the words Mikado and kephalos (Greek for "head"), referring to the way the skull was preserved, the authors likening its appearance to a game of pick-up sticks, while the species name comes from the Latin words gracilis (slender) and rostrum (snout). However, the authors did not mention Besanosaurus or include it in their comparisons, likely due to them not being aware of its relatively recent publication at the time.

Sander argued that Mikadocephalus was probably a junior synonym of Besanosaurus in 2000, noting that they were anatomical similar. Additionally, he found the fact that Besanosaurus and Mikadocephalus would have lived in the same environment to be ecologically implausible given how many other ichthyosaurs had been reported from Monte San Giorgio. He also considered it possible that Wimanius, another fragmentary ichthyosaur named in 1998 by Maisch and Matzke, was a juvenile Besanosaurus rather than its own genus, though he also noted that it may instead belong to the same species as the unnamed medium-sized shastasaurid. However, Sander argued that the better-preserved material would need to be studied before definite assignments could be made. Later the same year, Maisch and Matzke defeneded the validity of Mikadocephalus, listing multiple differences between it and Besanosaurus. Additionally, they referred PIMUZ T 4376 to M. gracilirostris, and assigned another specimen to Besanosaurus, PIMUZ T 1895. This specimen, coming from the Cava Tre Fontane mine, consists of a skull associated with postcranial remains, with little limb and tail material. Preparation of this specimen remains incomplete.

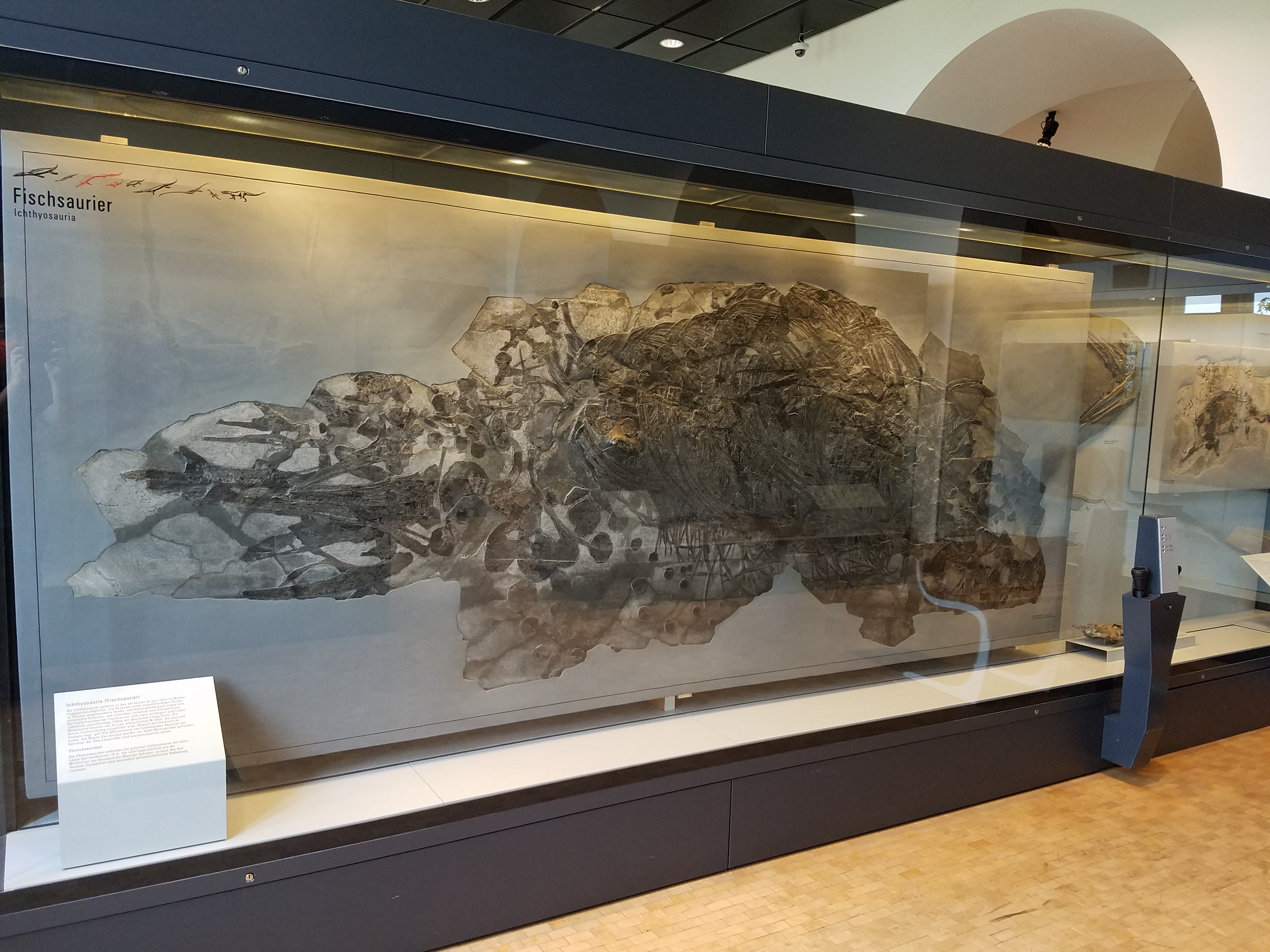
Referred specimen PIMUZ T 4847 on display at the Natural History Museum, Zurich

In a 2003 book, Christopher McGowan and Ryosuke Motani listed both M. gracilirostris and Wimanius odontopalatus as a species inquirendae, and also considered the high diversity of ichthyosaurs reported from Monte San Giorgio suspicious. They considered both genera potentially synonymous with the much earlier-named Pessosaurus, though remained tentative as the material was not studied firsthand. While Pessosaurus polaris had previously been considered nondiagnostic and thus a nomen dubium, McGowan and Motani suggested that due to its wide historical recognition the name could be revived for some distinctive referred material, noting its similarity to that of the Swiss medium-sized shastasaurid. However, they argued that the medium-sized skeleton, as well as similar Chinese ichthyosaurs, would need to be described in greater detail before they could assess the validity of P. polaris. Maisch argued that Wimanius and Mikadocephalus were distinct and valid in 2010, stating that there were was no morphological or phylogenetic support for their synonymy, and kept Besanosaurus and Mikadocephalus separate as well. Otherwise, however, little further research was published on the taxonomy of Besanosaurus.

In 2021, a paper by Gabriele Bindellini and colleagues detailing the skull anatomy of Besanosaurus was published. The authors studied six shastasaurid specimens from Monte San Giorgio, namely the holotypes of Besanosaurus and Mikadocephalus, PIMUZ T 4376, PIMUZ T 4847, PIMUZ T 1895, and BES SC 1016, most of which had not previously had their skull anatomy described in detail. BES SC 1016 had not been previously studied at all, and is an incomplete, somewhat flattened, partially articulated skull preserved in dolomite, which was analyzed with CT scans. It was recovered from stratum 70 at Sasso Caldo, the same site at which the holotype of Besanosaurus was discovered. The authors reassessed the status of Mikadocephalus, finding many of the features initially used to distinguish it to be present in Besanosaurus as well, and were not able to find any distinguishing characteristics between the two genera. Therefore, they synonymized M. gracilirostris with B. leptorhynchus, and referred the other four specimens to the latter species as well, since they also showed identifying features of Besanosaurus. The same team of authors continued their revision of Besanosaurus with a study of the postcranial anatomy published in 2024. Another study published earlier that year, led by Christian Klug, considered Wimanius to probably be a distinct genus from Besanosaurus, though noted that more research would be needed to confirm this.

=== Putative specimens from Svalbard and Germany ===
Historically, a fairly rare species of large ichthyosaur was reported from the units informally termed the "Upper Saurian Niveau" of Svalbard, spanning from the Ladinian stage of the Middle Triassic to the Carnian stage of the Late Triassic. The first remains of this taxon were a total of 11 vertebrae with some associated rib fragments found during the 1860s, and named Ichthyosaurus polaris by John Hulke in 1873. The species was subsequently suggested to belong to Shastasaurus or Cymbospondylus instead, before Carl Wiman named a new genus, Pessosaurus, to contain the species. Wiman assigned many additional specimens to P. polaris, comprising all large ichthyosaur specimens from the Upper Saurian Niveau. Pessosaurus was subsequently recognized by many authors, but its validity was questioned by Sander and Faber in 1998. Specifically, these authors noted that there were not enough differences preserved in the material to distinguish Pessosaurus from other shastasaurids, and that it was too fragmentary to establish a species on. Additionally, they questioned Wiman's assumption that only one large ichthyosaur was present in the Upper Saurian Niveau, noting that multiple species of large ichthyosaurs were known to coexist elsewhere. Therefore, they considered Pessosaurus to be a nomen dubium and indeterminate shastasaurid.

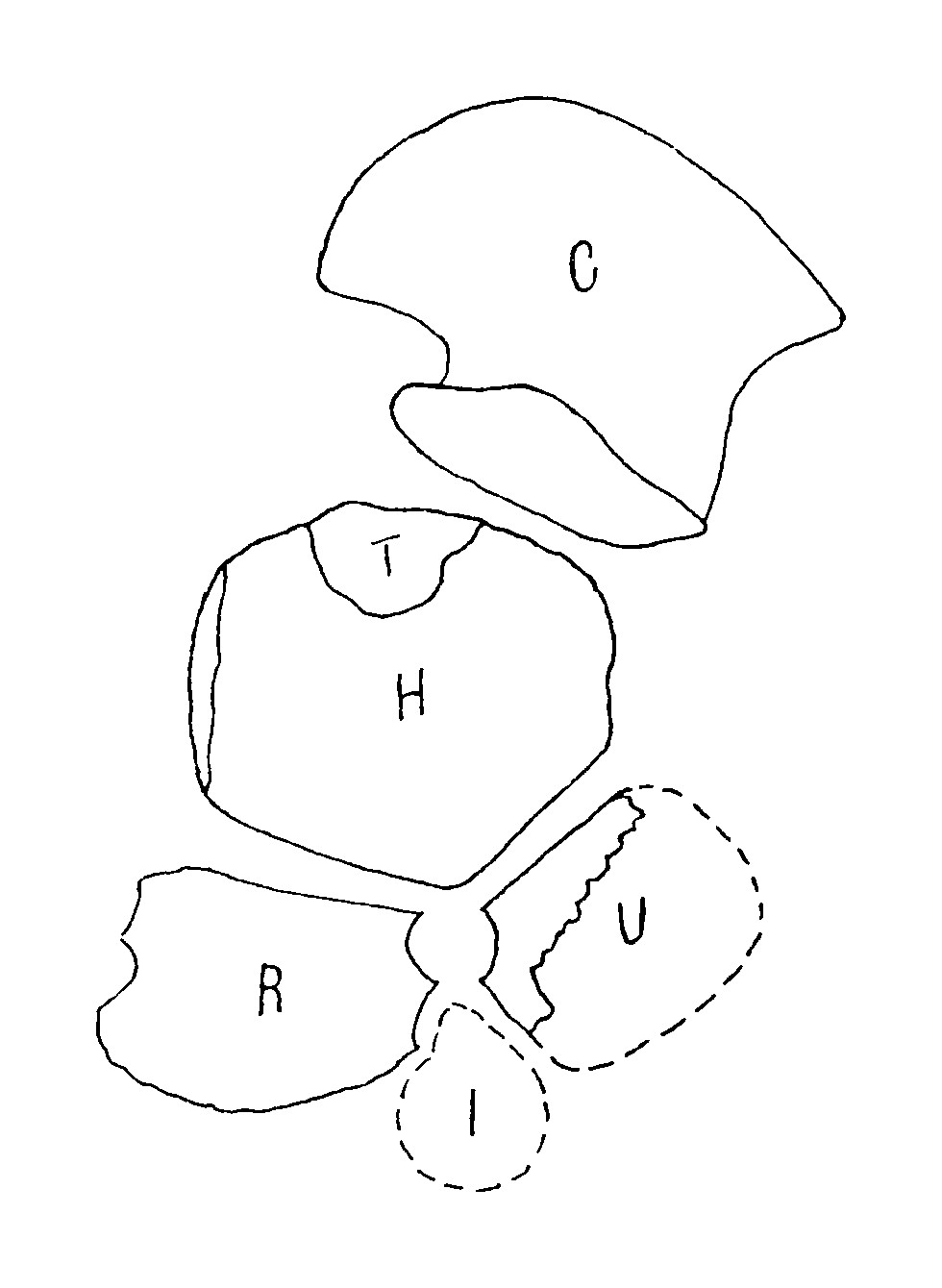
Diagram of the specimen assigned to Pessosaurus that was suggested to have affinities with Mikadocephalus

Maisch and Matzke in 2000 agreed with the taxonomic position of Sander and Faber, but argued that PMU 24584 (formerly cataloged as PMU R176), a "Pessosaurus" specimen consisting of associated shoulder and forelimb material, including a humerus, would be diagnostic. They found it to be very similar to PIMUZ T 4376, the medium-sized shastasaurid from Monte San Giorgio. They observed some differences between the two, but argued that they could be growth-related. As they considered PMIUZ T 4376 to belong to Mikadocephalus, they tentatively assigned the Svalbard specimen to Mikadocephalus cf. gracilirostris. While Motani had previously agreed with Pessosaurus being a nomen dubium, he took a different stance in his 2003 book with McGowan, noting that the morphology of the humerus was unique, as was that of the bones associated with it. Like Maisch and Matzke, he recognized its similarity with the specimen in Zürich, but instead argued that Pessosaurus should be reinstated as the name for the material due to its historical significance, in which case it could be the senior synonym of Mikadocephalus. Since PIMUZ T 4376 had a femur similar to those historically assigned to Pessosaurus, Motani argued that Wiman was probably right that only one large ichthyosaur was present in the Upper Saurian Niveau.

In their 2013 reassessment of Triassic ichthyosaurs of Svalbard, Erin Maxwell and Benjamin Kear argued in favor of Sander and Faber's assessment of Pessosaurus as a nomen dubium, since the eight centra (vertebral bodies, some of which were subsequently lost) making up its holotype were nondiagnostic. While they acknowledged the distinctiveness of the forelimb and shoulder material, they argued it was too poorly known to make any definite taxonomic statement on it, and that there was insufficient evidence to assume only one was present in the Upper Saurian Niveau. Due to the Svalbard specimens not matching those from Monte San Giorgio in age, Maxwell and Kear argued against the assignment of the former to species from the latter location. In 2024, Bindellini and colleagues determined that the similar femur anatomy of PIMUZ T 4376 and Pessosaurus was the result of the femora being incomplete. They also noted that the elements preserved in PMU 24584 showed differences from those of Besanosaurus, indicating that it pertained to a different ichthyosaur, although similar or even related.

Another large ichthyosaur from Svalbard, Pessopteryx nisseri, comes from the Early Triassic Vendomdalen Member of the Vikinghøgda Formation, was named based on various specimens by Wiman in 1910. However, the material Wiman named this species based on is chimaeric, comprising both ichthyopterygian remains and jaw material of omphalosaurids, a related group of crushing-toothed marine reptiles. This resulted in temporary disagreement over whether the name Pessopteryx should be used for the ichthyosaur or omphalosaurid material, and the names Rotundopteryx and Merriamosaurus were sometimes employed if Pessopteryx was considered to be the omphalosaurid. However, consensus subsequently emerged that Pessopteryx is indeed the correct name for the ichthyosaurian material. In 2003, McGowan and Motani argued that Pessopteryx nisseri was a nomen dubium, and that the ichthyopterygian remains referred to it also represented multiple species. They noted that some elements were comparable to those of Besanosaurus and Isfjordosaurus, specifically various limb bones in the case of the former, considering the differences observed to be growth-related. Maisch, however, in 2010, argued against this synonymy, noting that his previous publications with Matzke had found various differences between Pessopteryx and Besanosaurus, and recovered the two of them as not being particularly close relatives. He also maintained that Pessopteryx was a valid genus. Maxwell and Kear in 2013 doubted the assignment of some of the material considered to be Pessopteryx by Maisch and Matzke, but agreed that it was distinct from Besanosaurus and considered it to be potentially valid. Bindellini and colleagues in 2024 also considered Pessopteryx to be distinct from Besanosaurus, and concluded that there was no evidence of Besanosaurus from Svalbard.

In 1916, Friedrich von Huene erected a second species of Pessosaurus, P. suevicus, on the basis of a single vertebra discovered in the Muschelkalk of the Black Forest in the state of Baden-Württemberg, Germany. Although this taxon has been widely recognized as a nomen dubium since the late 20th century, Maisch and Matzke noted in 2000 the possibility that the fossil material came from Besanosaurus or a similar ichthyosaur, but agreed that it could not be distinguished from other representatives of the group.

== Description ==
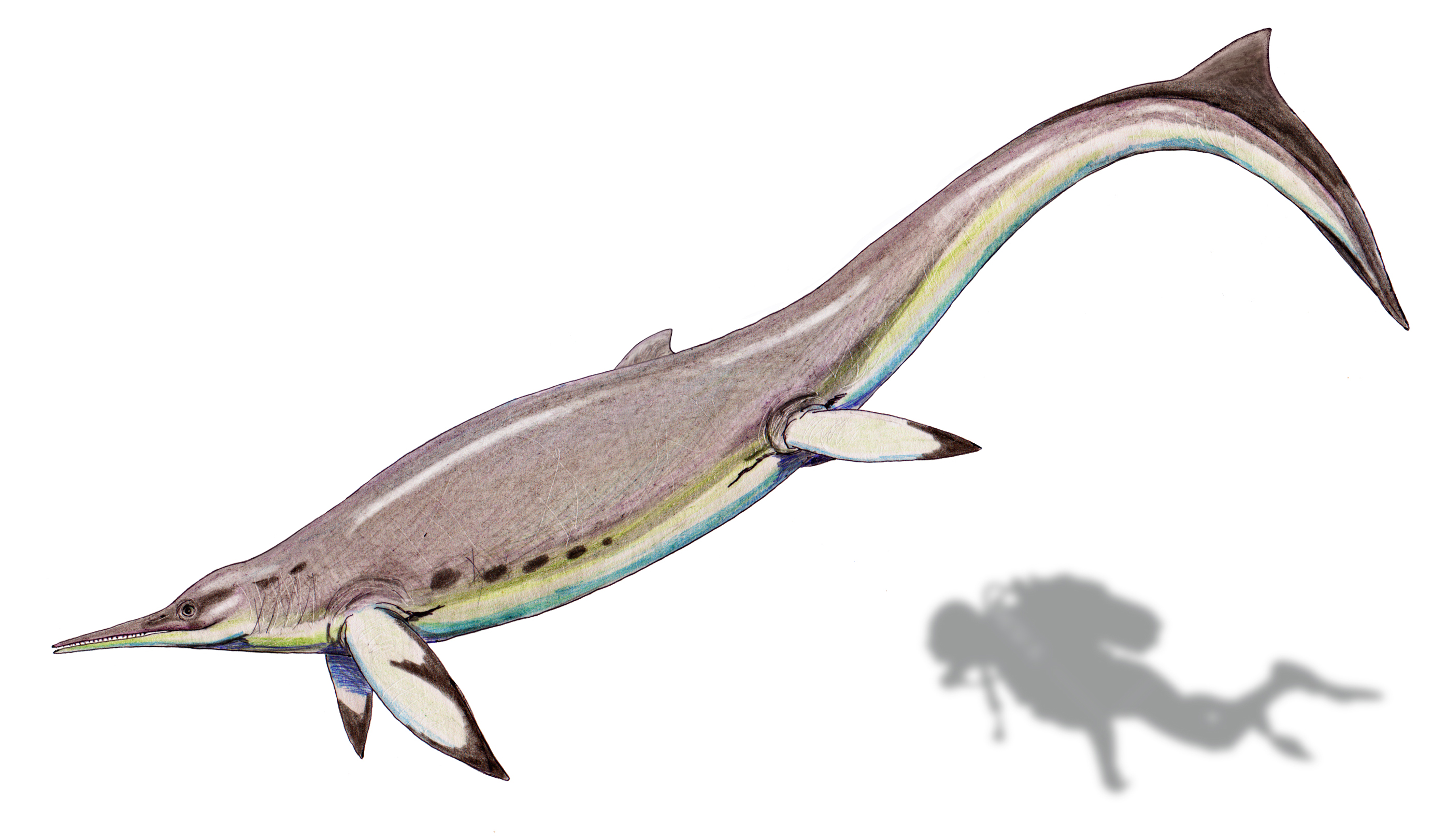
Life restoration

Ichthyosaurs like Besanosaurus were marine reptiles, with flippers for limbs and a fin on the tail. While later ichthyosaurs developed fish-shaped body plans, Besanosaurus is more elongate, and resembles Cymbospondylus in overall shape. The skull of Besanosaurus is proportionately quite small, making up less than 10% of the animal's total length in the holotype. In addition to having an elongate trunk, about half of the total length of Besanosaurus is formed by its very long tail. The holotype specimen measures 5.065 meters (16.62 ft) long from its snout tip to tail tip. The specimen PIMUZ T 4847 was estimated by Bindellini and colleagues in 2021 to have a total length of 8 meters (26 ft), and is the largest known specimen of Besanosaurus, indicating that Besanosaurus is the largest known ichthyosaur in its environment.

=== Skull ===
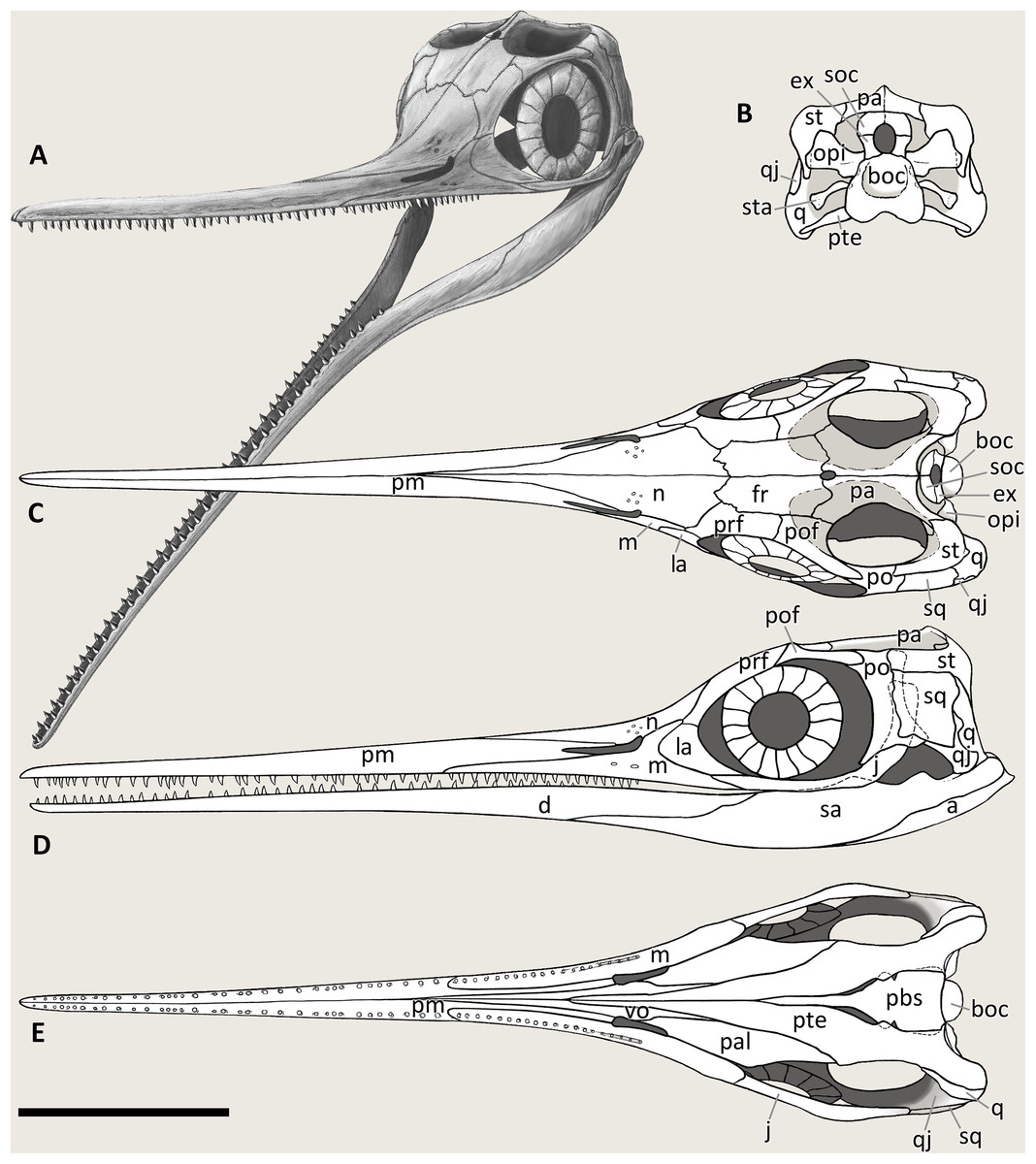
Skull reconstruction in oblique (A), rear (B), top (C), side (D), and bottom (E) views

About two-thirds of the skull of Besanosaurus is occupied by its very long, thin snout lined with small teeth. This distinctive snout is strongly demarcated from the rear part of the skull by a constriction. Well-preserved Besanosaurus skulls show drawn-out slotlike external nares, openings which housed the nostrils in life. Behind the external nares are the elliptical orbits, somewhat longer than tall. Within the orbits are the scleral rings, circles of bony, quadrangular plates that supported the eyeballs. Bindellini and colleagues estimated a total of between 15 and 17 of these plates per ring in Besanosaurus. While large relative to the orbits, the rings are smaller relative to the animal's overall length than typical for parvipelvian ichthyosaurs. Further back, the top of the skull is perforated by another pair of openings, the supratemporal fenestrae, which are rather small in Besanosaurus. Extending forwards from each supratemporal fenestra is a depression, forming roughly elliptical terraces in front of the fenestrae. The region behind the orbits is short, occupying 13% of the skull's length, though it is still long compared to some parvipelvians.

In the upper jaw, the snout is formed by the elongation of the tooth-bearing premaxillae. The front ends of these bones are blunt, while their rear ends are forked, with processes extending both above and below the external nares. The back edges of the external nares are formed by the upwards-directed processes of the maxillae, gracile, triradiate bones behind the premaxillae. While initially interpreted as not forming part of the narial border in the holotype, further specimens revealed that the nasals, which run along the top of the snout, do participate in the upper back corners of the external nares. Along the midline of the skull, between the front ends of the temporal fenestrae, is a small opening called the pineal foramen, whose border is formed by the frontals in front and parietals on the sides and back. A sagittal crest also runs along these two pairs of bones. The frontals are long, broad, and flat bones involved in the supratemporal terraces, though they do not form any part of the borders of the supratemporal fenestrae. The parietals bear a variety of prominent surfaces for jaw muscle attachment, including the sagittal crest and their contributions to the rims of the supratemporal fenestrae.

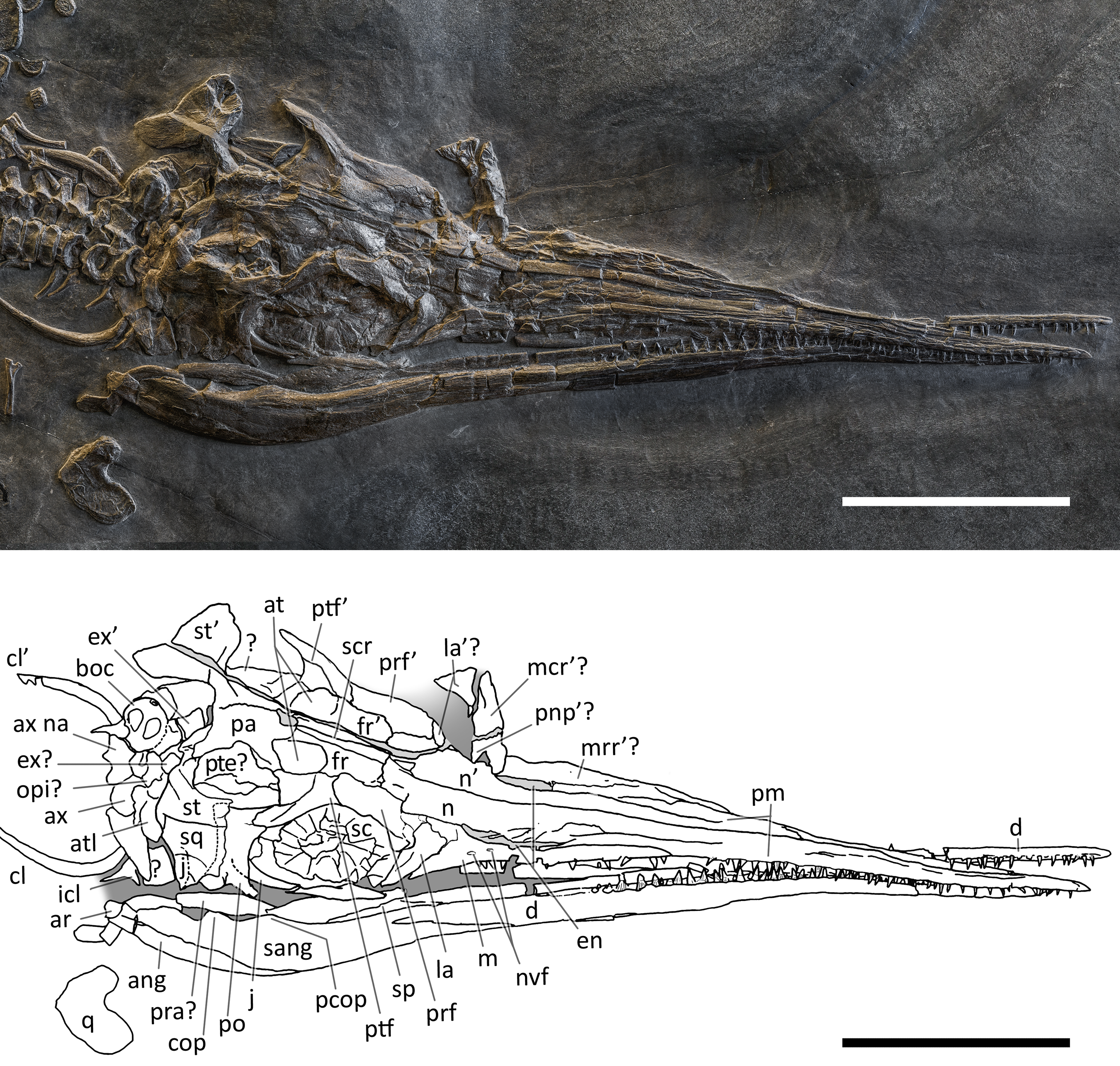
Photograph and diagram of the skull of PIMUZ T 4376

The front portions of the orbits are formed by a pair of crescentic bones called lacrimals. The prefrontals and postfrontals make up the top of the orbital rim, where they are thickened. The prefrontals also extend forwards, where they contact the ascending processes of the maxillae. The back edges of the orbits are formed by the postorbitals, which also reach upwards and enter the supratemporal fenestrae. On the lower regions of the sides of the skull, wide portions of the postorbitals are visible, which Bindellini and colleagues considered potentially autapomorphic of the genus. The jugals are thin, strip-like bones bent at right angles. The articulations with other bones holding it in place were rather weak, and resultingly the jugals were often disarticulated from the skull during fossilization. The squamosals of Besanosaurus are large and quadrangular, as is typical for ichthyosaurs with longer cheek regions, and seen in many other shastasaurids.

The jaw joint was formed by the robust, kidney-shaped quadrates in the cranium. Each quadrate has a triangular eminence on the lower part of its inner margin. In 1997, Maisch and Matzke considered this to be a unique feature of Mikadocephalus, as at the time it was only known in the holotype skull of that taxon; however, Bindellini and colleagues identified this on multiple Besanosaurus specimens in 2021, as well as a specimen of Guanlingsaurus, and therefore suggested that it may be a fairly widespread feature of shastasaurids. The vertebral column is articulated with a convex eminence on the back of the skull known as the occipital condyle. Above this, the spinal cord entered through an opening called the foramen magnum, which Bindellini and colleagues reconstructed as rounded and roughly pentagonal in Besanosaurus. The stapedes of Besanosaurus, a pair of bones in the braincase, are broad-ended but slender-shafted. The openings between the pterygoids in the rear part of the palate was interpretted as wide by Maisch and Matzke in their description and reconstruction of GPIT 1793/1; however, Bindellini and colleagues in their redescription argued that this was not necessarily the case due to the specimen's disarticulation, and noted that the width of the interpterygoid vacuity was of typical width for a shastasaurid in BES SC 1016. The pterygoids possess long processes for articulation with the quadrates.

Most of the lower jaw is formed by the long, thin toothbearing dentaries. Behind the dentaries, the large surangulars form the top portion of the rear part of the lower jaw. The upper margin of each surangular bears two eminences, a taller, pointed one immediately in front of the jaw joint and another, lower one further forwards. Based on comparisons with Chaohusaurus, Bindellini and colleagues interpretted the taller of the two projections as the coronoid process, formed through the fusion of the coronoid to the surangular. The coronoid process is massive in Besanosaurus, only rivaled in its development by that of Phantomosaurus. The teeth of Besanosaurus are all similar in shape, being small, cone-shaped, and acutely pointed. The tooth crowns are lined with vertical ridges, though lack cutting edges, while the tooth roots bear even stronger ridging. The teeth are separated from each other by a rather wide amount of space and interlock when the jaw is closed. The frontmost teeth in the upper jaw are the longest, and somewhat curved, while the back teeth are shorter and thicker, with a similar pattern of size and shape also present in the lower jaw. How the teeth are implanted varies through the tooth row; throughout most of the upper jaw, the teeth are set into sockets, with the exception of the rear 30% of the maxillary teeth, which are implanted in a groove. Conversely, in the lower jaw, the front teeth are located in a groove while the back teeth are set into sockets.

=== Vertebrae and ribs ===
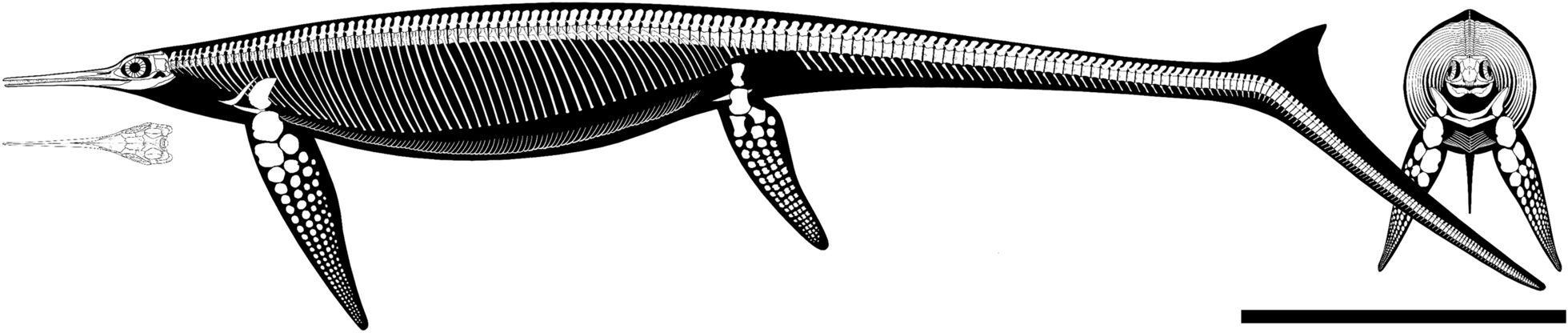
Skeletal reconstruction of Besanosaurus based after the holotype

The holotype of Besanosaurus preserves 201 vertebrae, 61 of which are located in front of the hips. These vertebrae, termed presacral vertbrae, consist of 12 neck vertebrae, located in front of the shoulders, and 49 dorsal vertebrae, located in the trunk. The neck vertebrae have prominent zygapophyses (bony projections of the vertebrae) and large, robust neural spines with roughly round cross-sections. The roughly rectangular neural spines of the trunk vertebrae are also tall, and are more than half as wide from side to side as they are from front to back. The vertebral bodies, known as centra, of the presacral vertebrae are circular in outline. The dorsal centra are at most half as long as tall. The front and back faces of all the centra are concave, being bowed inwards to a very thin layer of bone if not an opening. The articular surfaces for the ribs on the sides of the dorsal centra extend forwards to the front edges of the centra, but they are not truncated. The frontmost cervical ribs (those attached to the neck vertebrae) are double-headed, unlike the other, single-headed cervical ribs behind them. The dorsal ribs bear grooves along their shafts. The heavily built gastralia (belly ribs) form a basket on the underside of the torso, with each gastralium composed of a midline element flanked by two addition elements on each side. Behind the presacral vertebrae, the holotype preserves at least two hip vertebrae, which bore ribs with wide ends that may have articulated with the hip bones.

The tail of the holotype makes up more than half of the animal's length and contains at least 138 vertebrae. While the frontmost caudal (tail) centra are roughly equidimensional like the presacral centra, those in the middle and end of the tail are proportionally narrower from side to side. In their initial description, Dal Sasso and Pinna were not able to determine if the holotype of Besanosaurus had a tailbend due to how the tail was preserved, though they suggested the tail would have been fairly straight. However, PIMUZ T 1895 preserves five wedge-shaped caudal centra, which formed an approximately 30° bend in the tail. The neural spines located in front of the bend are angled backwards, those above the bend are vertical, and those behind the bend are angled forwards. By comparing the anatomy of these vertebrae with those of the holotype, Bindellini and colleagues identified the tail bend as occurring from the 56th to 60th tail vertebrae. Only the first six tail vertebrae bear ribs, which are rather short. However, there are surfaces for the articulation of caudal ribs on the centra all the way down to the tail bend, indicating that there may have been cartilaginous ribs associated with these vertebrae. Beneath the tail vertebrae are the chevrons, V- or Y-shaped bones, present beneath the fifth or sixth tail vertebra and onward.

=== Appendicular skeleton ===
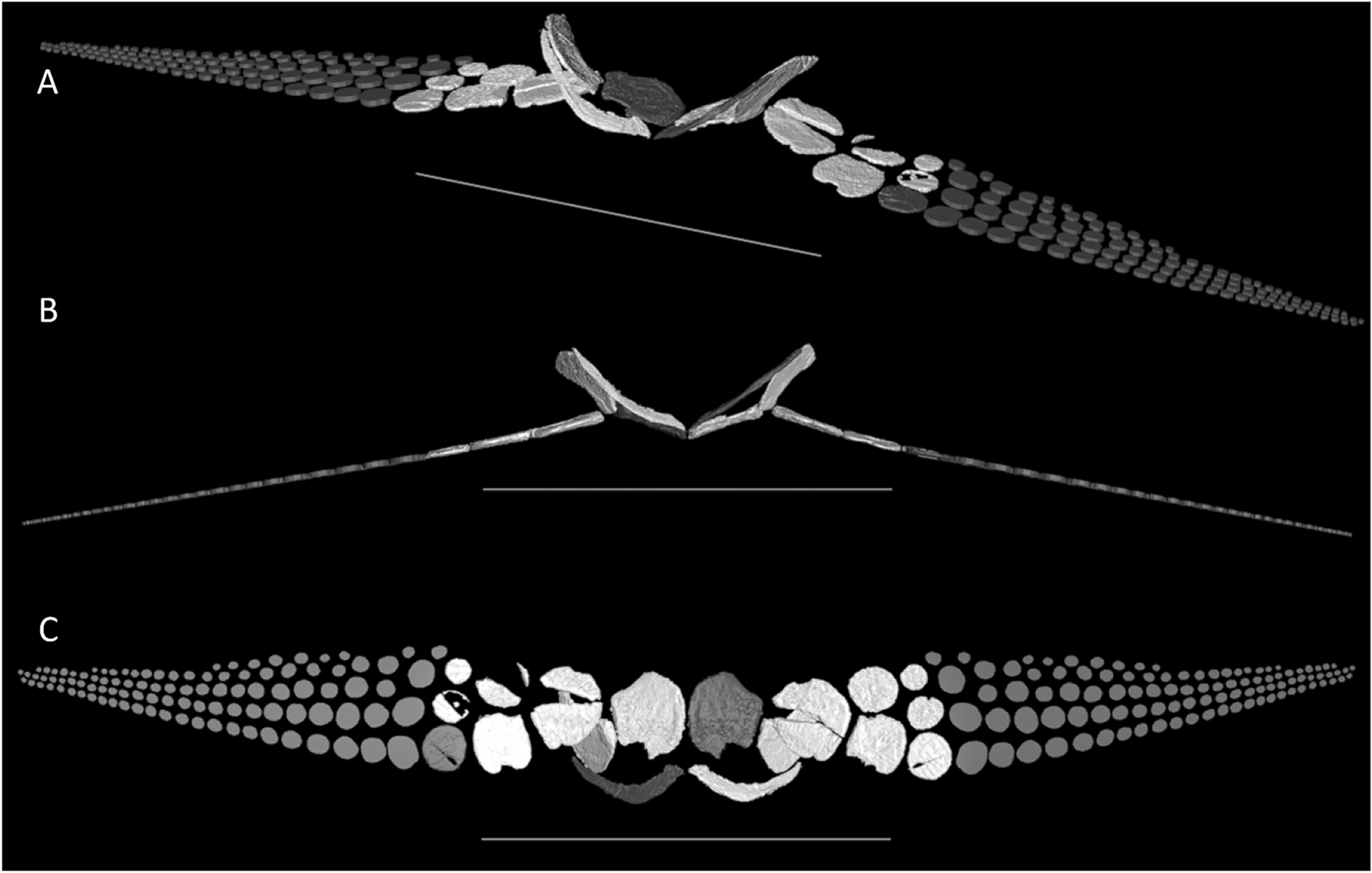
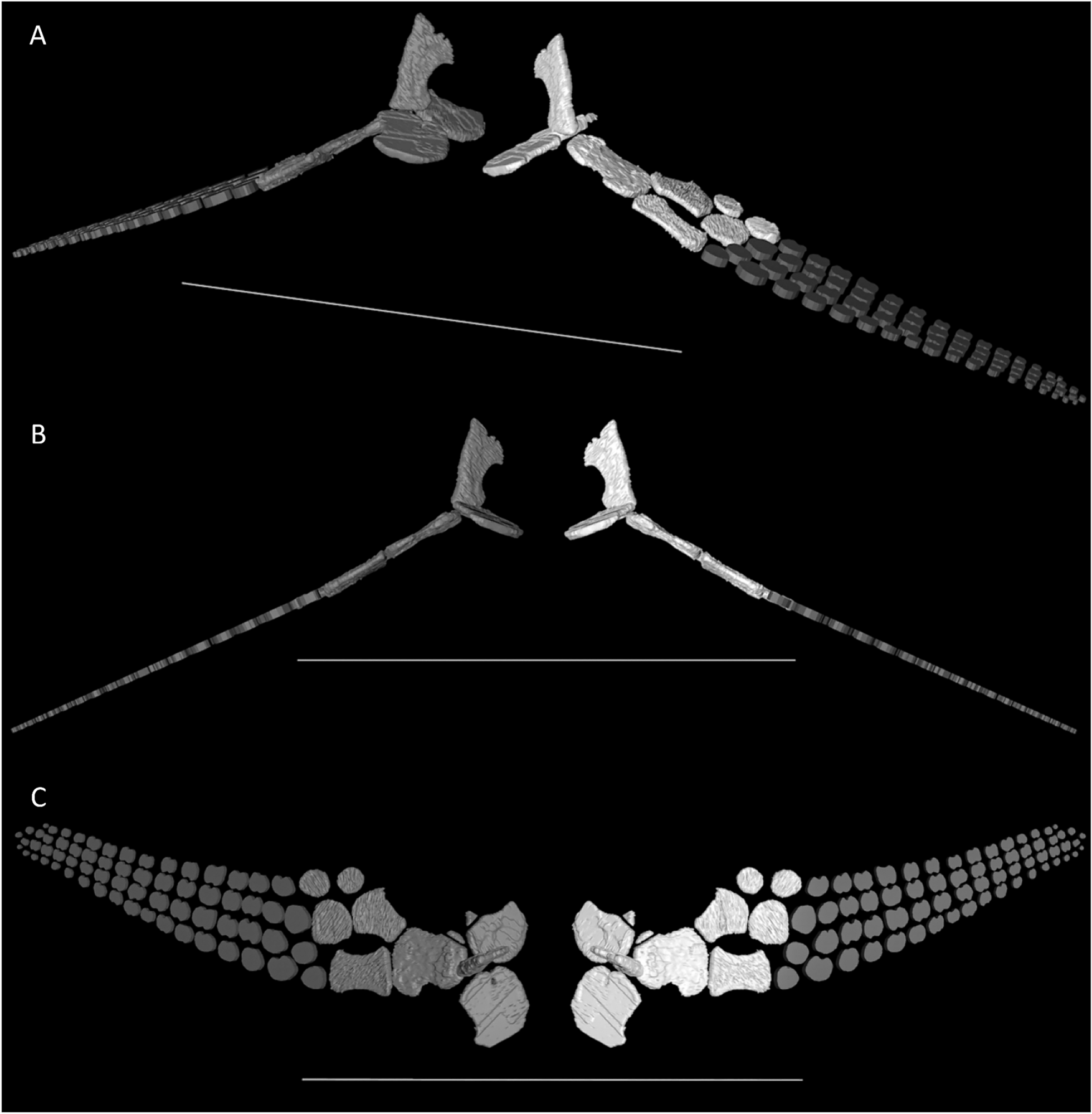
Reconstructed forelimbs and shoulder girdle (left) and hindlimbs and pelvis (right) of the Besanosaurus holotype, seen in (from top to bottom) oblique, front, and lower views. Known elements in white

The sickle-shaped scapulae of Besanosaurus are wide and flat, bearing enlarged backwards extensions that produce very broad upper ends. Another pair of shoulder bones, the coracoids are shaped like axe heads, with strongly concave front edges, weakly concave back edges, and rounded inner edges. In Cymbospondylus, each coracoid is pierced by a foramen; however, no such openings are present in those of Besanosaurus. The clavicles (collarbones) of Besanosaurus are thin and broadest at their middles, and a triradiate bone called the interclavicle is located between them on the midline. The upper hip bones of Besanosaurus, the ilia, are large and rather wide, with their upper ends enlarged and directed inwards and their lower ends more heavily expanded. The pubic bones (front lower hip bones) are vaguely circular in shape. They each bear a well-developed but narrow notch extending to the back edge of the bone, rather than an enclosed foramen. This notch is well-developed in PIMUZ T 4376, but it is almost closed in the holotype.

The forelimbs of Besanosaurus are longer than its hindlimbs, and mostly composed of rounded bones. There are five digits in each forelimb, corresponding to the second to fifth fingers and an additional accessory digit behind them. The humeri are very short, being slightly wider than they are long, and have a somewhat rounded profile. Both the front and back edges of the humeri are bowed inwards, though this emargination is more notch-like on the front edges. The lower arm bones as wide as they are long and about two thirds the length of the humerus, with the radii being larger than the ulnae. The roughly quadrangular radii have constricted middles, while the ulnae behind them are rounded and somewhat smaller. The carpals, metacarpals, and phalanges (finger bones) are also rounded, the latter two types having the shape of circles. The phalanges in the forelimb are well-spaced, indicating that extensive cartilage was present in the forelimbs during life.

The hindlimbs of Besanosaurus are roughly 70% the length of its forelimbs. There are only four digits in each hindlimb, corresponding to the second to fifth toes. The femora are longer than wide, though only by a factor of 1.22 and are resultingly still quite stout. The femora are narrowest midshaft, broadening at their upper ends. The tibiae and fibulae are also constricted at their middles and narrower than the radii and ulnae. The tibiae are the longer of the two pairs of lower leg bones, and the fibulae have heavily expanded lower ends. Compared with the corresponding elements of the forelimb, the tarsals, metatarsals, and phalanges of the hindflippers are less robust. Furthermore, while round, the phalanges of the pes are oblong and constricted. They are also packed together, indicating that the hindlimbs had less cartilage than the forelimbs and may also have been more rigid.

== Classification ==
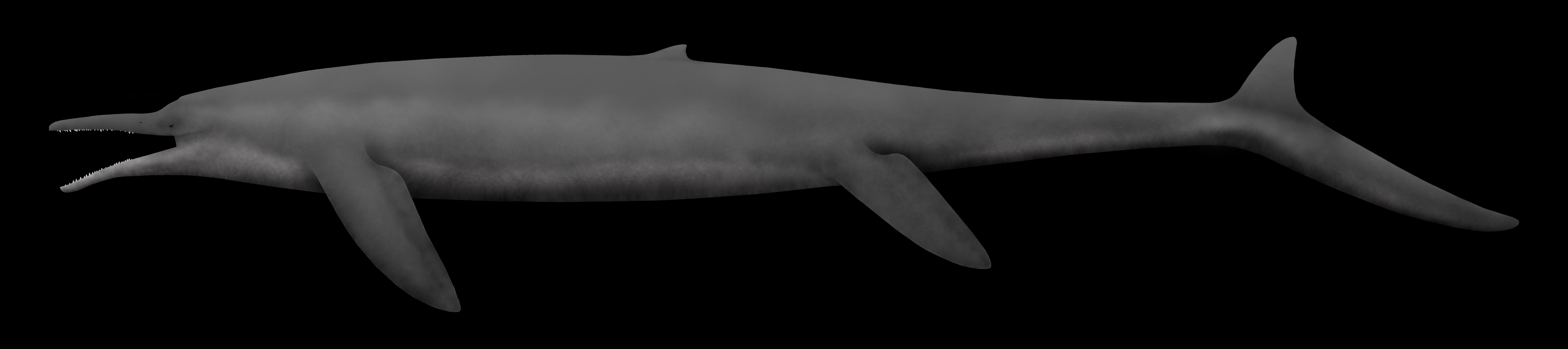
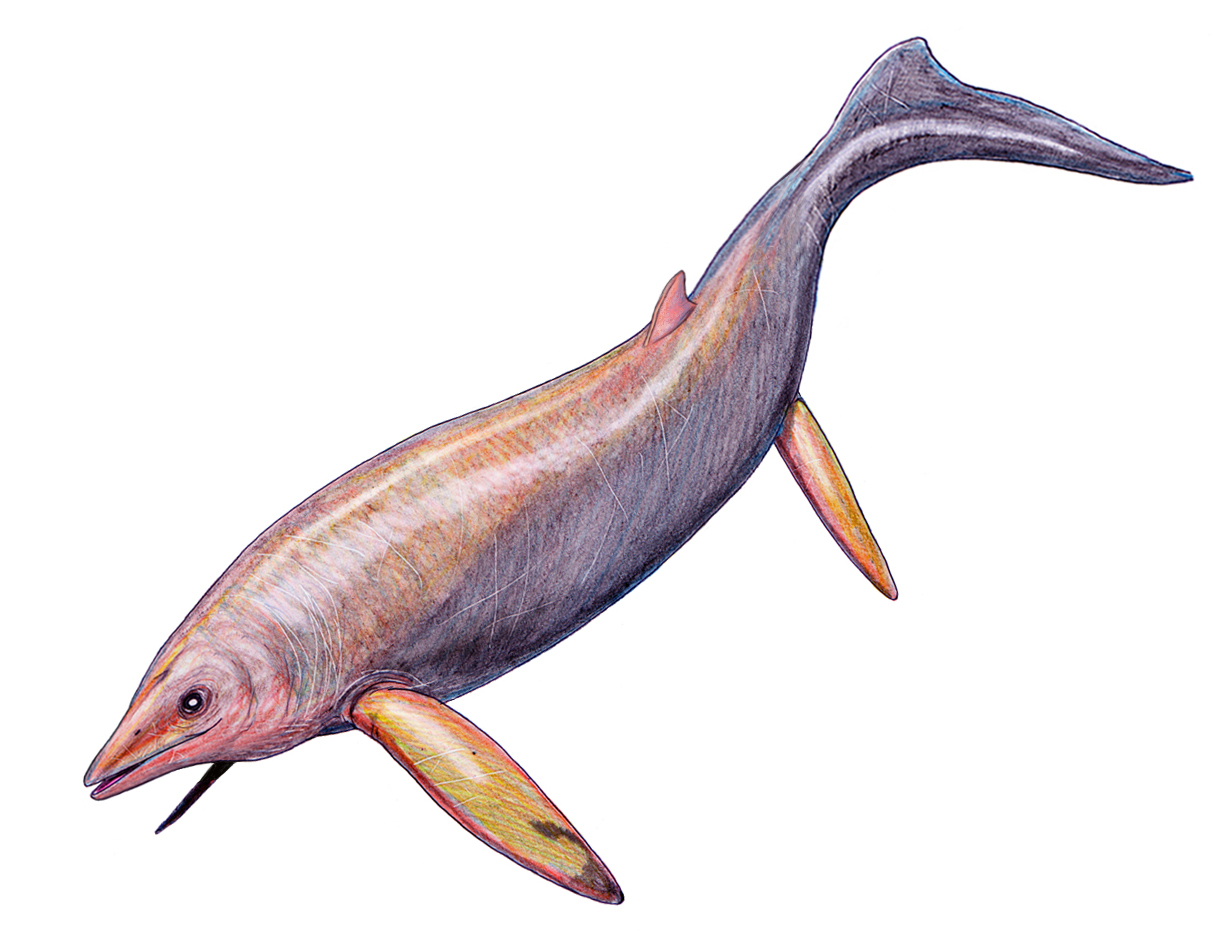
While superficially resembling Cymbospondylus (top), Besanosaurus is more closely related to Shastasaurus (bottom)

While Besanosaurus has generally been considered a shastasaurid, how it is related to other shastasaurids is unclear due to the poorly understood phylogeny of the group. To determine the phylogenetic affinities of Besanosaurus, Dal Sasso and Pinna coded it into a data matrix created that was created by Jack Callaway in 1989. They found shastasaurids to be divisible into two main groups, termed Cymbospondylinae and Shastasaurinae by Callaway, with the former being a grade leading up to the latter. Besanosaurus was placed in an intermediate position between these two subfamilies by the analysis. While Dal Sasso and Pinna noted that Besanosaurus superficially resembled Cymbospondylus in overall body shape, they found it to compare more favorably to the shastasaurines in the fine points of its anatomy, and thus tentatively assigned it to Shastasaurinae. The phylogenetic analysis of Dal Sasso and Pinna was one of the earlier of such studies on ichthyosaurs, and subsequent publications have criticized it for a variety of reasons. Key among these issues is that their analysis did not test their assumption that Shastasauridae was a natural group, as their matrix did not include any non-shastasaurid ichthyopterygians other than Grippia. The usage of Cymbospondylinae for a paraphyletic group and the inclusion of highly fragmentary taxa was also criticized.

The first comprehensive, in-depth study of overall ichthyosaur relationships was done by Motani in 1999. The traditional concept of Shastasauridae was not recovered by his analysis, with some "shastasaurids" such as Cymbospondylus representing earlier branches of ichthyosaur evolution while others like Californosaurus were found to be more closely related to the later, post-Triassic ichthyosaurs. Some shastasaurids, however, were found to form a natural group in his analysis, Besanosaurus among them. Based on the results of his analysis, he placed Besanosaurus in Shastasauridae, but outside Shastasaurinae, formed by Shastasaurus and Shonisaurus. Merriamosauria was named for the group including the shastasaurids and later ichthyosaurs. Motani noted that some parts of the phylogeny were unstable, and that many traditional shastasaurids were "problematic" due to their incompleteness. Another large phylogenetic study conducted by Sander was published the following year, focusing on the more completely known ichthyosaurs. Unlike Motani, Sander found the three shastasaurids he included in his analysis to form a natural group, with Besanosaurus being the sister taxon of Cymbospondylus and Shonisaurus being basal to the two. This analysis was criticized by subsequent work for only using a small sample of ichthyosaurs and encoding proportional characters based on arbitrary divisions. Concerns were also raised about the reproducibility of his results and the extremely high amount of homoplasy (convergent evolution of features by unrelated groups) implied by his cladogram.

A third major analysis of ichthyosaur relationships was done by Maisch and Matzke later in 2000, featuring many similarities to Motani's analysis but based on a larger data set. Like Motani, Maisch and Matzke found the traditional shastasaurids to not be a natural group, however, they also found Motani's concept of Shastasauridae to be a grade leading up to the post-Triassic ichthyosaurs and their relatives, with Besanosaurus as the first of these taxa to branch off. As it was considered separate at the time, Mikadocephalus was also coded into their analysis, and found to be more closely related to the post-Triassic ichthyosaurs than Besanosaurus. They had previously found a similar result in a smaller study they conducted in 1997, which found Mikadocephalus to be more closely related to the post-Triassic ichthyosaurs. However, the phylogeny of Maisch and Matzke (2000) has subsequently been criticized for using a hypothetical ancestor, rather than actual non-ichthyosaurian taxa, as an outgroup. McGowan and Motani considered Besanosaurus to fall outside of Merriamosauria in 2003, and named a new monotypic family, Besanosauridae, to contain it. Maisch also used this family for Besanosaurus in 2010, though he considered it to be within Merriamosauria. He classified Mikadocephalus in a separate family, Guanlingsauridae, alongside Guanlingsaurus in the same paper.

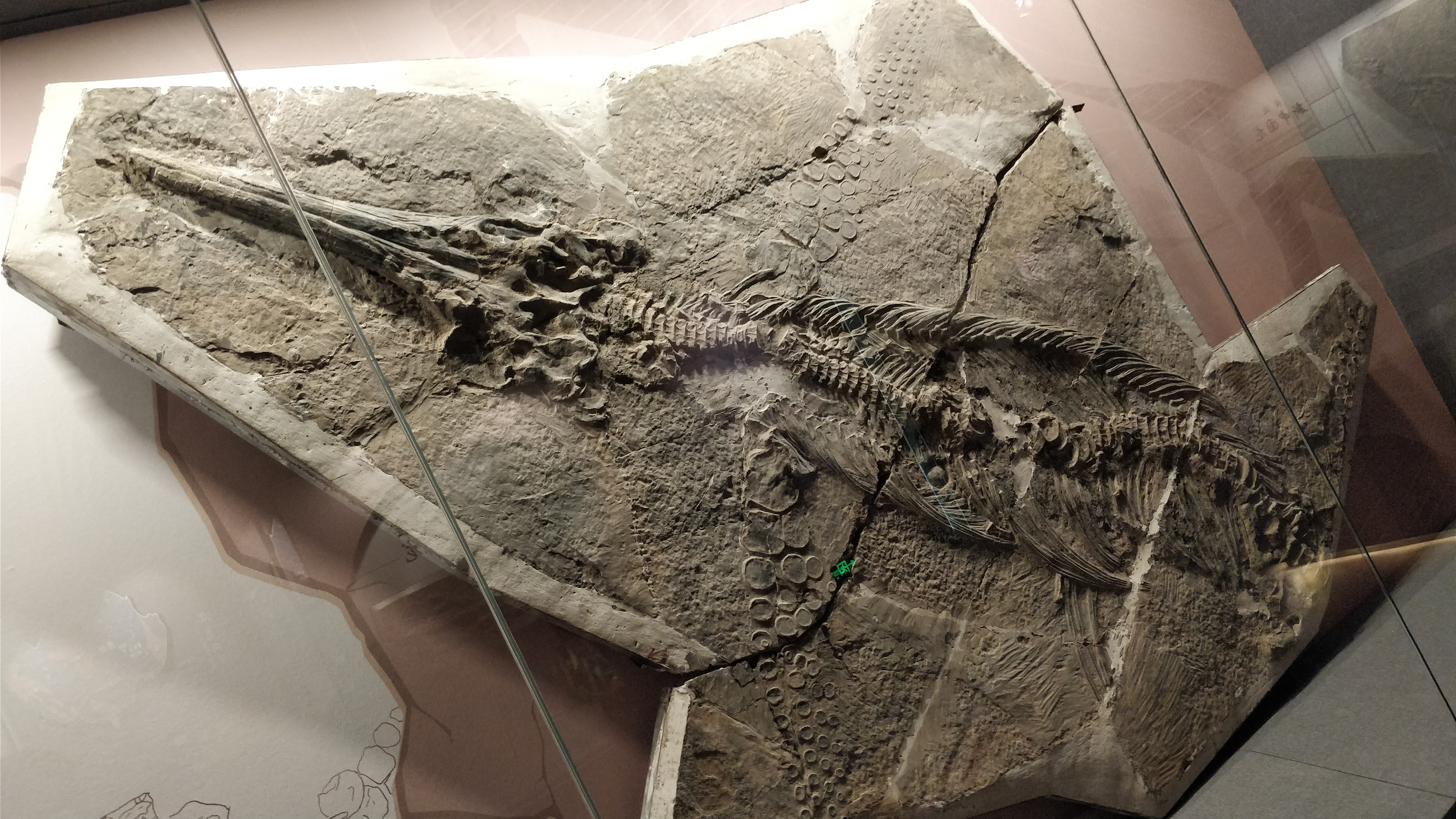
Skeleton of Guizhouichthyosaurus, which may be a close relative of Besanosaurus

In 2011, Philippa Thorne and colleagues ran an analysis based on an updated version of Motani's 1999 data matrix. Their analysis found Besanosaurus to be part of the shastasaurid clade (natural group). The results of another comprehensive analysis by Cheng Ji and colleagues were published in 2016, and was based on a much larger data set than previous studies. A large, well-supported clade of shastasaurids was recovered by their study, with Besanosaurus as the earliest diverging member. Another series of very large analyses were run by Benjamin Moon in 2017, created by revising and compiling previous analyses. The analyses, however, were unable to clearly elucidate the relationships of many early merriamosaurs, making it unclear whether or not Besanosaurus was a shastasaur. In their 2021 study, Bindellini and colleagues updated the codings for Besanosaurus and some other shastasaurids in the analysis of Ji and colleagues, preferring this study over Moon's larger one as it was constructed with more direct observation of the specimens. They found multiple different configurations of shastasaurids, with the group either being a grade or a clade, with the former arrangement found with marginally more frequency. Within the grade, Besanosaurus was found to be the earliest diverging member, while within the clade it was either in a similar position or in a smaller nested group with Guizhouichthyosaurus and "Callawayia" wolonggangense. Due to this instability, Bindellini and colleagues considered shastasaurid relationships to still be ambiguous.

The following cladograms depict the three hypotheses recovered by the analysis of Bindellini and colleagues, 2021.

Cladogram showing paraphyletic Shastasauridae:

- Merriamosauria
  - Besanosaurus
  - - Guizhouichthyosaurus
    - - "Callawayia" wolonggangense
      - - Guanlingsaurus
        - - Shastasaurus
          - - Shonisaurus
            - - Callawayia
              - - Californosaurus
                - - Toretocnemidae
                  - Parvipelvia

Cladogram showing monophyletic Shastasauridae:

- Merriamosauria
  - - Besanosaurus
    - - Guizhouichthyosaurus
      - - "Callawayia" wolonggangense
        - - Guanlingsaurus
          - - Shastasaurus
            - Shonisaurus
  - - Callawayia
    - - Californosaurus
      - - Toretocnemidae
        - Parvipelvia

Cladogram showing monophyletic Shastasauridae:

- Merriamosauria
  - - - "Callawayia" wolonggangense
      - - Guizhouichthyosaurus
        - Besanosaurus
    - - Guanlingsaurus
      - - Shastasaurus
        - Shonisaurus
  - - Callawayia
    - - Californosaurus
      - - Toretocnemidae
        - Parvipelvia

== Paleobiology ==
Ichthyosaurs like Besanosaurus were very well-adapted to their marine existence, spending their entire lives in the water and showing reduced levels of ossification of their bones. Nevertheless, ichthyosaurs still would have breathed air. Ichthyosaurs were active animals with high metabolic rates, able to maintain their body temperatures. The large eyes of ichthyosaurs indicate that vision would have been an important sense for them. Besanosaurus is the earliest known long-snouted diapsid that attained a large body size. Bindellini listed many potential advantages of large size, including it allowing various feeding techniques, being an anti-predator adaptation, and resulting in more efficient thermoregulation. A 2020 survey of ichthyosaurs from Monte San Giorgio by Judith Pardo-Pérez and colleagues found that shastasaurids like Besanosaurus were more likely to show skeletal injuries than the smaller mixosaurids, but showed less frequent injuries than Cymbospondylus, thought to have preyed upon larger animals. The holotype of Besanosaurus exhibits ankylosed (pathologically fused) metatarsals.

=== Locomotion ===
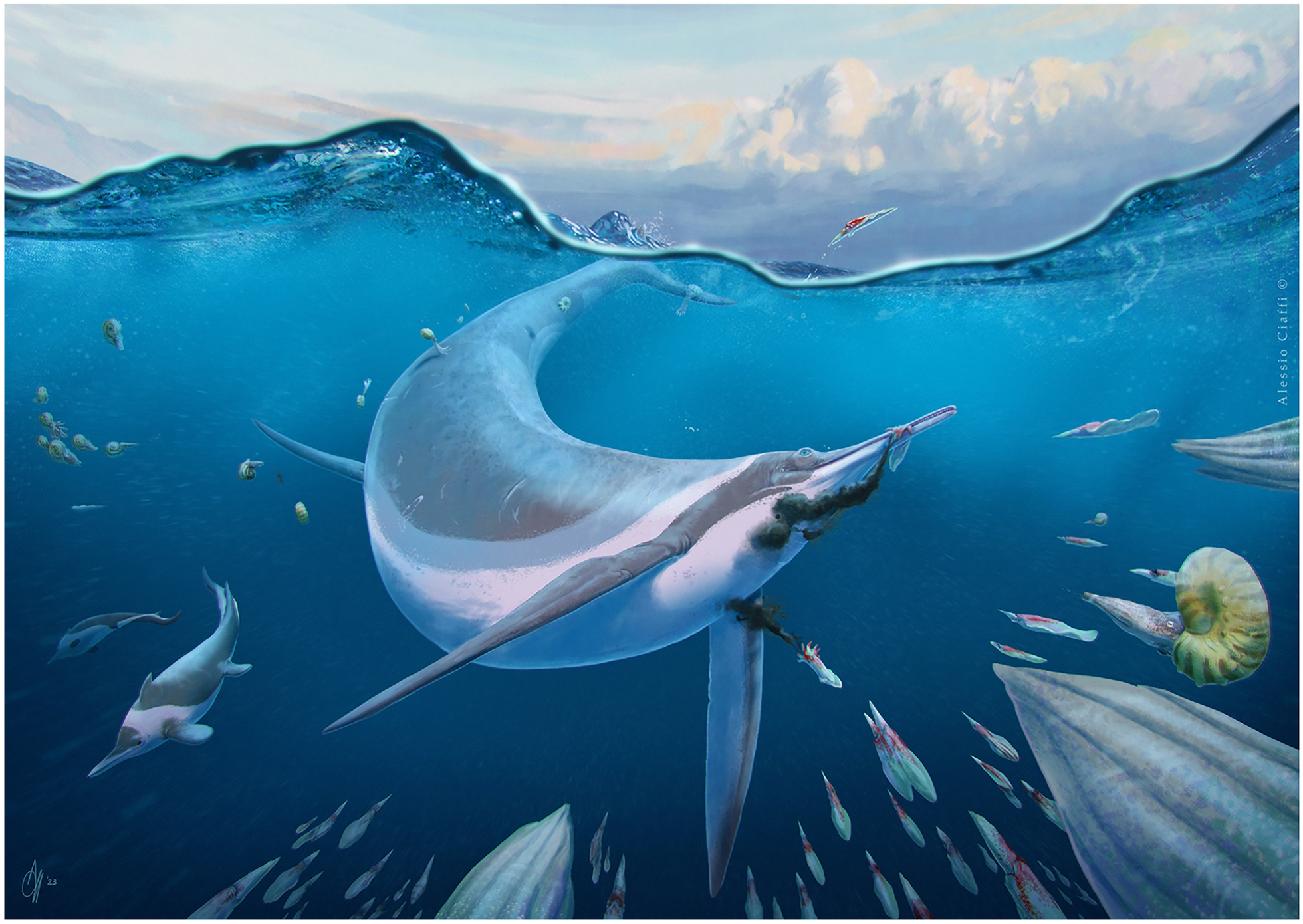
Life restoration of Besanosaurus capturing a Phragmoteuthis in its natural environment. Note the eel-like swimming method depicted

Intermediate-grade ichthyosaurs likely used anguilliform (eel-like) or subcarangiform locomotion, swimming by undulating their entire body from side to side, owing to their long tails without strong bends and their long, flexible trunks. This differs from the more tail-driven locomotion presumed for the more spindle-shaped parvipelvians. The body shape of Besanosaurus closely resembles that of Cymbospondylus, however, the shape of its tail fin is more similar to that of Guizhouichthyosaurus. Bindellini and colleagues in 2024 interpretted this as evidence of a swimming style for Besanosaurus intermediate between these two taxa. The ribs of Besanosaurus were predominantly single-headed, with double-headed ribs limited to the neck. Since single-headed ribs are less firmly braced against the vertebrae than double-headed ribs, this would have resulted in a flexible body. However, the rib articulations on the dorsal vertebrae are better developed in Besanosaurus than in Cymbospondylus, implying the former had a less flexible trunk than the latter. Conversely, the greater abundance of double-headed ribs in Mixosaurus and parvipelvians indicates these ichthyosaurs were stiffer-bodied than Besanosaurus.

The tailbend of Besanosaurus would have supported a tail fin. While this fin is not preserved in any known specimen, Bindellini and colleagues predicted that it would have been heterocercal, with a much smaller upper lobe than lower. While this shape of tail fin indicates slower swimming speeds, it allows for more maneuverability. The limbs of Besanosaurus were particularly long, which would have helped stabilize the animal while swimming, though they would not have been used for propulsion. While some ichthyosaurs, such as Mixosaurus, possessed a dorsal fin to keep the animal steady, the long limbs of Besanosaurus may have stabilized the animal enough that it did not need such a structure.

=== Diet and feeding ===
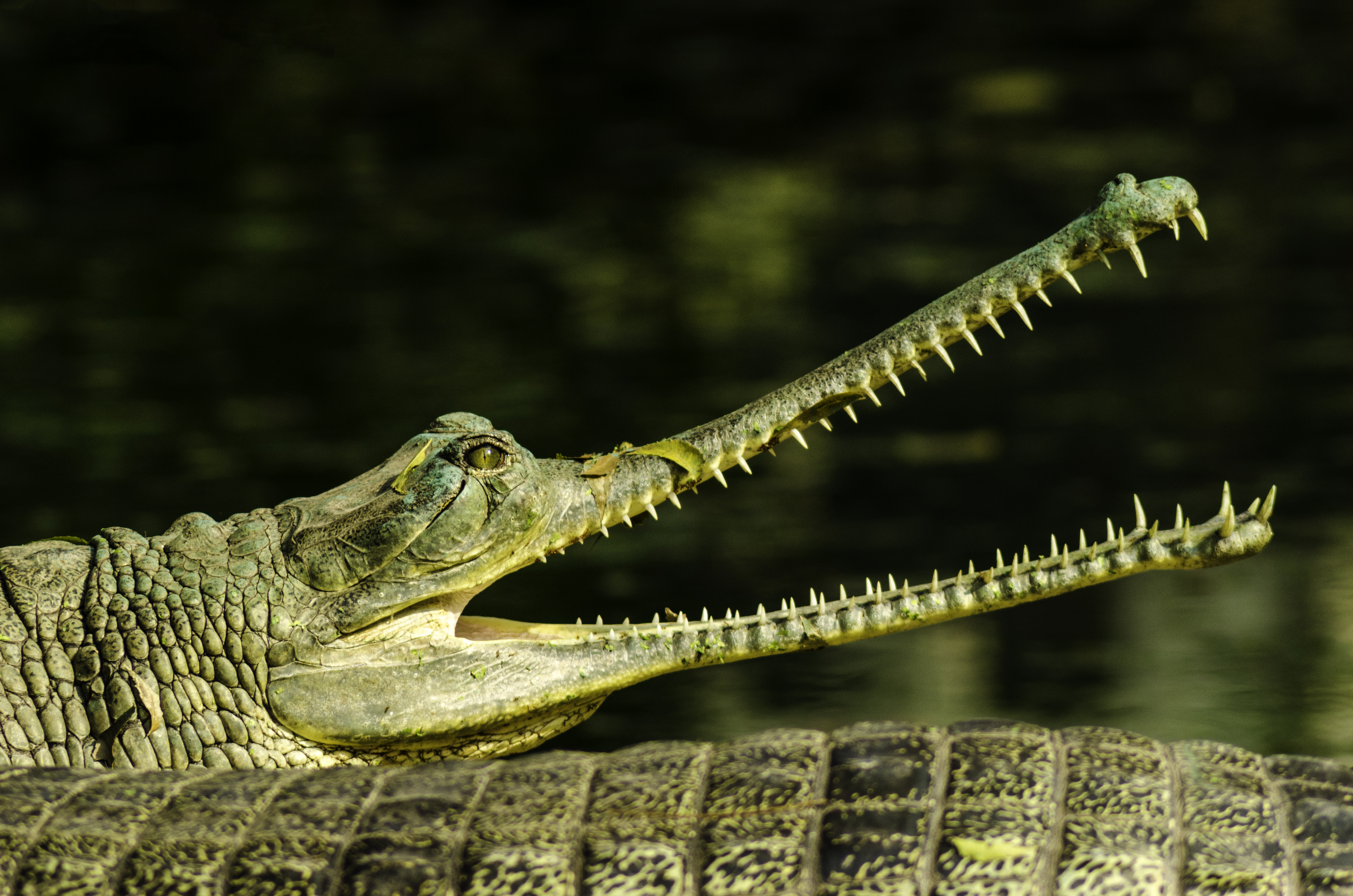
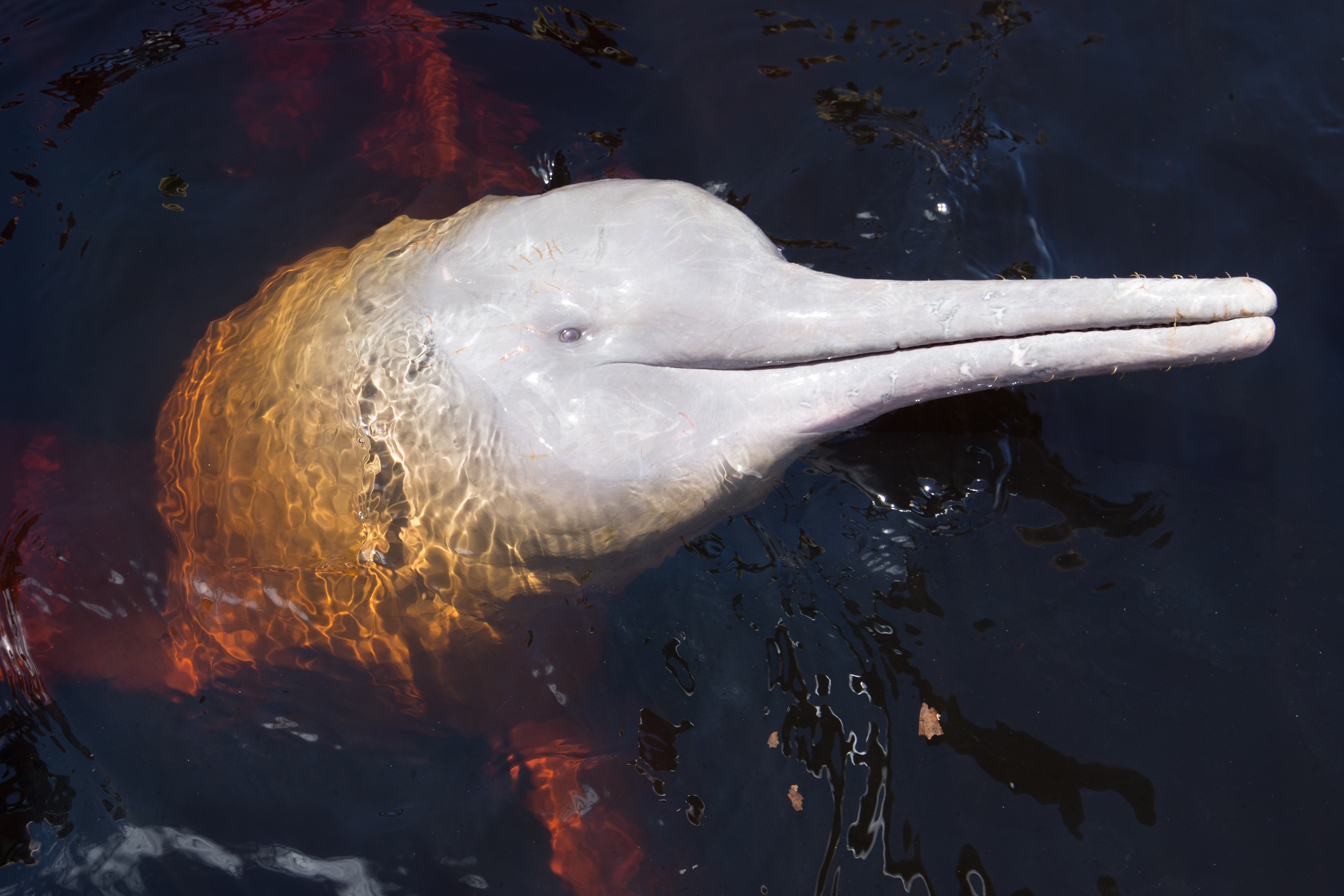
The long snout of Besanosaurus resembles those of gharials and river dolphins

Dal Sasso and Pinna considered Besanosaurus to likely have been specialized on feeding on coleoid cephalopods, based on the shape and small size of its teeth. Bindellini and colleagues elaborated on the tooth anatomy of Besanosaurus, noting that the slender teeth in front would have been suited for piercing small prey while the slightly blunter ones further back suited for catching cephalopods by grasping. Direct evidence of Besanosaurus feeding on cephalopods is present in the form of a Phragmoteuthis-like hooklet preserved as stomach contents in the holotype. However, following the discovery of a specimen of Guizhouichthyosaurus, a supposed cephalopod predator, with a considerable portion of a large thalattosaur in its stomach region, Da-Yong Jiang and colleagues speculated in 2020 that other large ichthyosaurs adapted for consuming cephalopods may have been able to take on large prey. The researchers noted that despite the rather delicate construction of the skull of Besanosaurus, a Mixosaurus would have been able to fit inside its mouth. However, Bindellini and colleagues doubted that Besanosaurus would have been a predator of large animals, citing its long, slender snout, arguing that a diet of small animals was more likely.

The large coronoid processes and rough, concave outer faces of the surangulars would have anchored strong jaw musculature. While the thin jaws of Besanosaurus would not have been able to support a powerful bite, Bindellini and colleagues noted that it could instead have allowed the jaws to rapidly close. The length of the jaws would have caused their tips to move quite quickly during biting. Additionally, the long, thin snout could have been swung efficiently through the water, allowing quick up and down or side to side movements. Altogether, this configuration is ideal for feeding on prey items that are small and agile. Long, thin snouts have convergently evolved multiple times in aquatic amniotes with similar feeding habits. As modern long-snouted predators such as some dolphins are piscivorous, Bindellini and colleagues suggested that Besanosaurus may have consumed fish as well as coleoids. Bindellini and colleagues also noted that the large size of Besanosaurus could have helped with prey capture as well by providing more inertia, with the head being able to have broad movement while the body stayed in place. The authors considered the animal's large size to have potentially resulted from its foraging method being particularly efficient.

=== Reproduction and growth ===
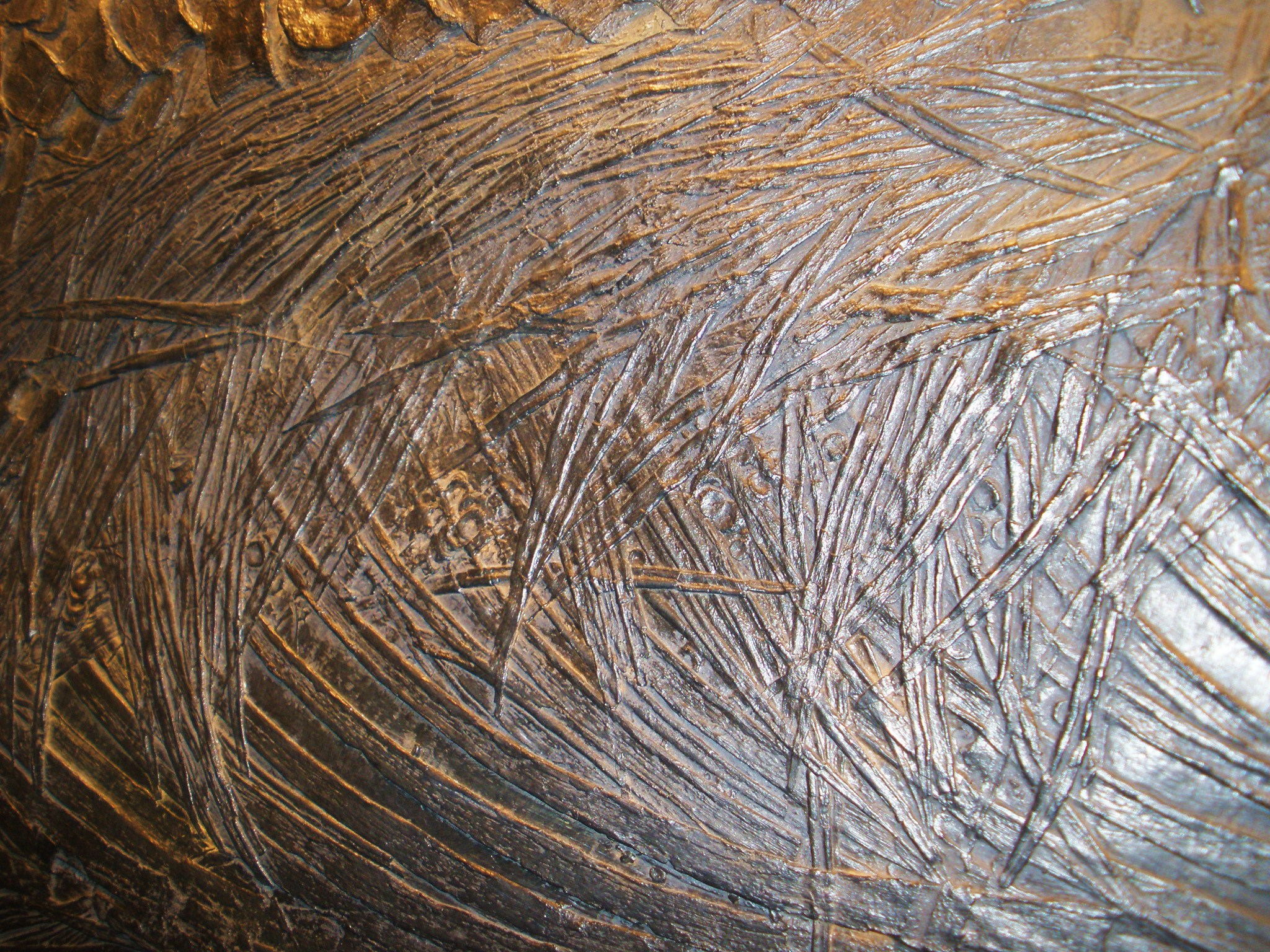
The small vertebrae preserved within the holotype's rib cage

Dal Sasso and Pinna discovered three or four small series of vertebrae within the holotype's chest through radiography. They interpretted the remains as pertaining to embryos, noting that a placement so far forwards in the body was not unheard of among ichthyosaurs. They also considered it doubtful that Besanosaurus would have been able to take on mixosaurid-sized prey. In a 2021 abstract, Feiko Miedema and colleagues regarded the embryonic remains as pertaining to one embryo. In 2023, Miedema and colleagues interpretted the embryo as being oriented so that it would have been born tail first, as typical in merriamosaurs. Historically, this orientation was thought to have evolved in ichthyosaurs to reduce the likelihood of the newborns drowning during birth; however, after surveying different vivaporous amniotes, Miedema and colleagues argued that the evidence for such an adaptation was lacking, and instead proposed that birth orientation was related to which way was easier to push the fetus through the birth canal or which way made affected the mobility of the pregnant adult less. However, embryos are not the only interpretation of these remains. Jiang and colleagues in 2020 were doubtful about the inability of Besanosaurus to have consumed mixosaurids, and argued that it could not be ruled out that the supposed embryos may be stomach contents instead, noting that the vertebrae were the right size for an immature mixosaurid, and were more ossified than would be expected in an embryo.

As ichthyosaurs grow, their skulls typically become proportionately smaller. In PIMUZ T 4376, the skull is roughly half the length of the trunk; whereas it is only about a third as long as the trunk in the holotype. This difference was considered too extreme to be the result of ontogeney by Maisch and Matzke in 2000, arguing the specimens were too similar in size. Thus, they used this feature to distinguish Mikadocephalus from Besanosaurus. Bindellini and colleagues, however, did not find ontogeny to be an unreasonable explanation for this proportional difference in their 2021 study, instead finding the six specimens they studied to fit into a growth series when ordered by size. Unlike the skull length-body length ratio of Besanosaurus, the researchers found the orbit size and mandible length to increase at the same rate, and the tooth anatomy of Besanosaurus to not change with ontogeny.

In 2024, Bindellini and colleagues mention that the ontogeny of Besanosaurus and the probable fetus present in the holotype's chest are subjects for future research.

== Palaeoenvironment ==
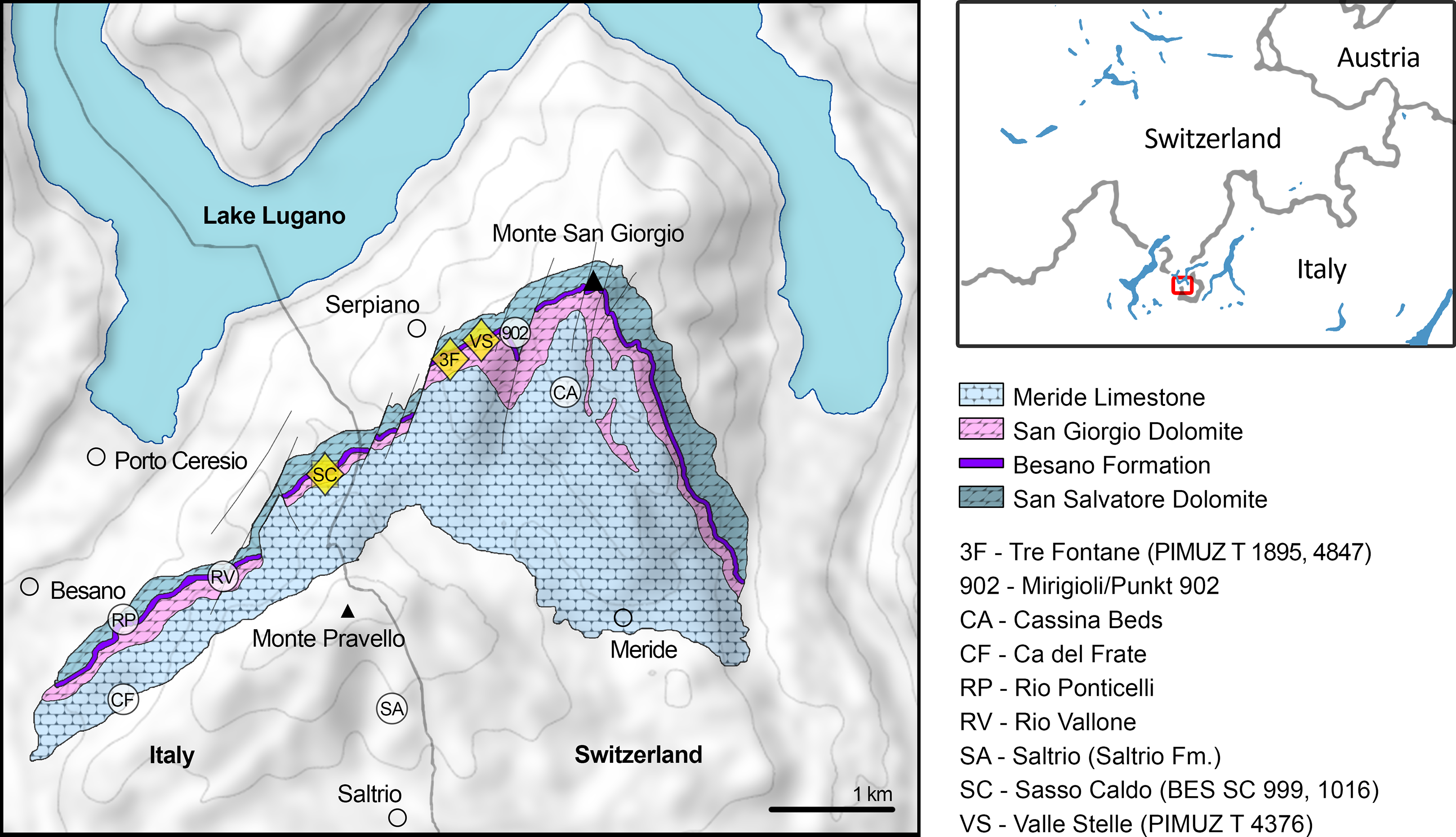
Map of where Besanosaurus specimens have been found (yellow diamonds) at Monte San Giorgio

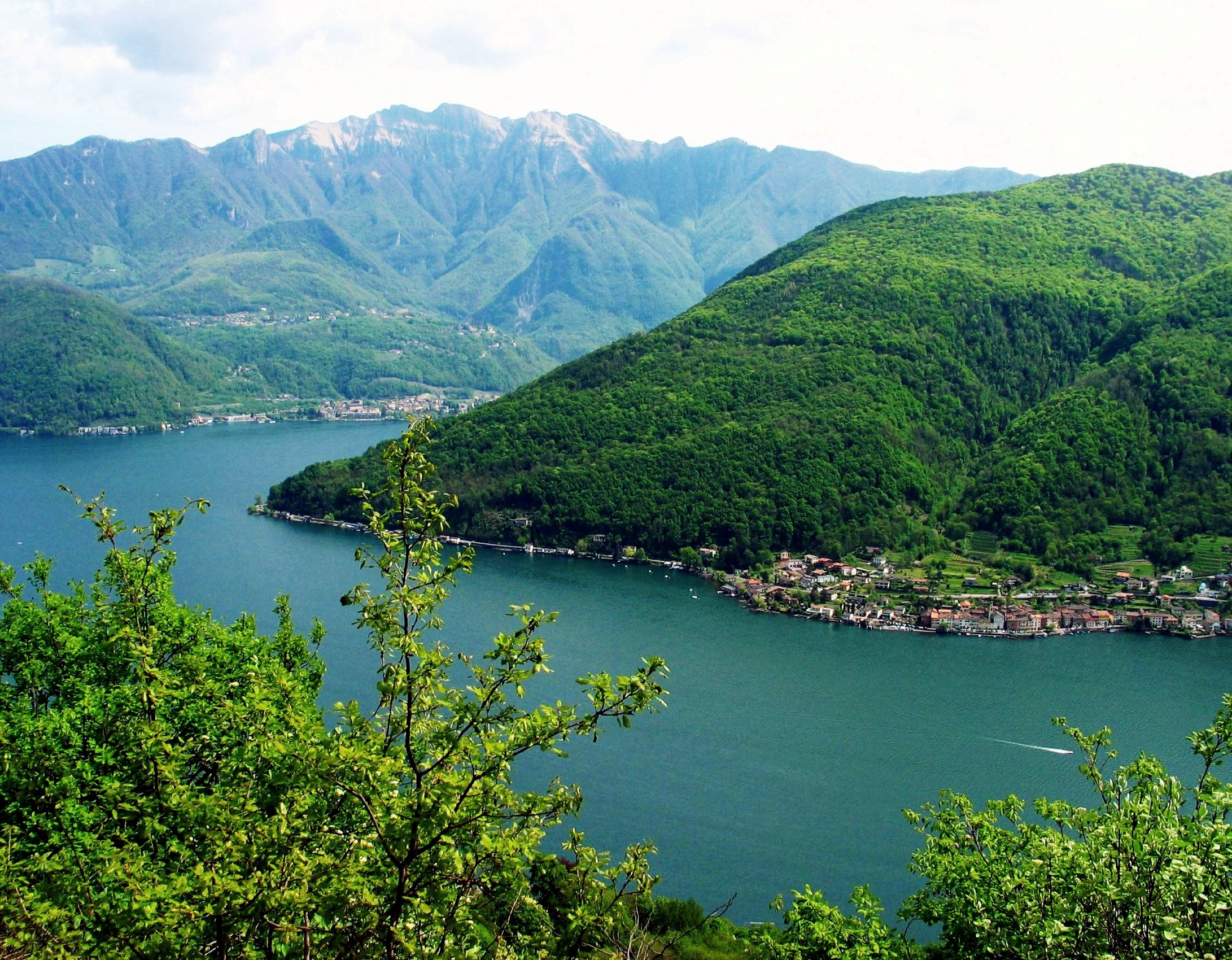
A view of Monte San Giorgio

All known definite specimens of Besanosaurus come from the Besano Formation (alternatively called the Grenzbitumenzone), a unit composed of oil shale, laminated dolomite, and tuff. This formation is one of a series of Middle Triassic units atop a carbonate platform at Monte San Giorgio, and measures 5–16 metres (16–52 ft) thick. The Besanosaurus specimens all were likely recovered from the middle portion of the Besano Formation, though the exact localities of some specimens are unknown. The middle Besano Formation is also known as the N. secedensis Zone, and dates to the latest Anisian, meaning that Besanosaurus is the oldest definite shastasaurid genus. Noting that other Middle Triassic ichthyosaur genera were very widespread, Bindellini and colleagues considered it likely that Besanosaurus too was a wide-ranging genus, despite all definite specimens being known from this unit in the Alps.

In the Triassic, when the Besano Formation was being deposited, the region where Monte San Giorgio is would have been a marine lagoon, located in a basin on the western side of the Tethys Ocean. This lagoon is estimated to be 30–130 metres (98–427 ft) deep. The upper waters of the lagoon contained abundant oxygen, and were inhabited by a diverse array of plankton and free swimming organisms. However, water circulation within the lagoon was poor, resulting in typically anoxic water at the bottom, deprived of oxygen. The lagoon bottom would have been quite calm, as evidenced by the fine lamination of the rocks, and there is little evidence of bottom-dwelling organisms modifying the sediment. The disarticulation seen in the holotype of Besanosaurus is minimal and random, which also indicates undisturbed waters. The presence of terrestrial fossils, such as conifers and land-dwelling reptiles indicates that the region would have been near land.

=== Contemporaneous biota ===
Among the most common of the invertebrates from the Besano Formation is the bivalve Daonella. Many gastropods are known from the Besano Formation; predominantly those that could have lived as plankton or on algae. Cephalopods present include nautiloids, coleoids, and the especially common ammonoids. The coleoids from the Besano Formation are not particularly diverse, but this may be due to their remains not readily fossilizing, with many of their known remains being preserved as stomach contents within the bodies of ichthyosaurs. Arthropods known from the formation include ostracods, thylacocephalans, and shrimp. Other, rarer invertebrate groups known from the formation include brachiopods and echinoids, which lived on the seabed. Radiolarians and macroalgae are also known in the formation, though the latter may have been washed in from elsewhere, as with many other bottom-dwelling organisms. Many bony fish have been recorded in this formation, with actinopterygians being quite diverse, including abundant small species as well as larger representatives like Saurichthys, though rarer sarcopterygian coelacanths were also present. The cartilaginous fish of the Besano Formation are uncommon as well and mainly consist of hybodonts.

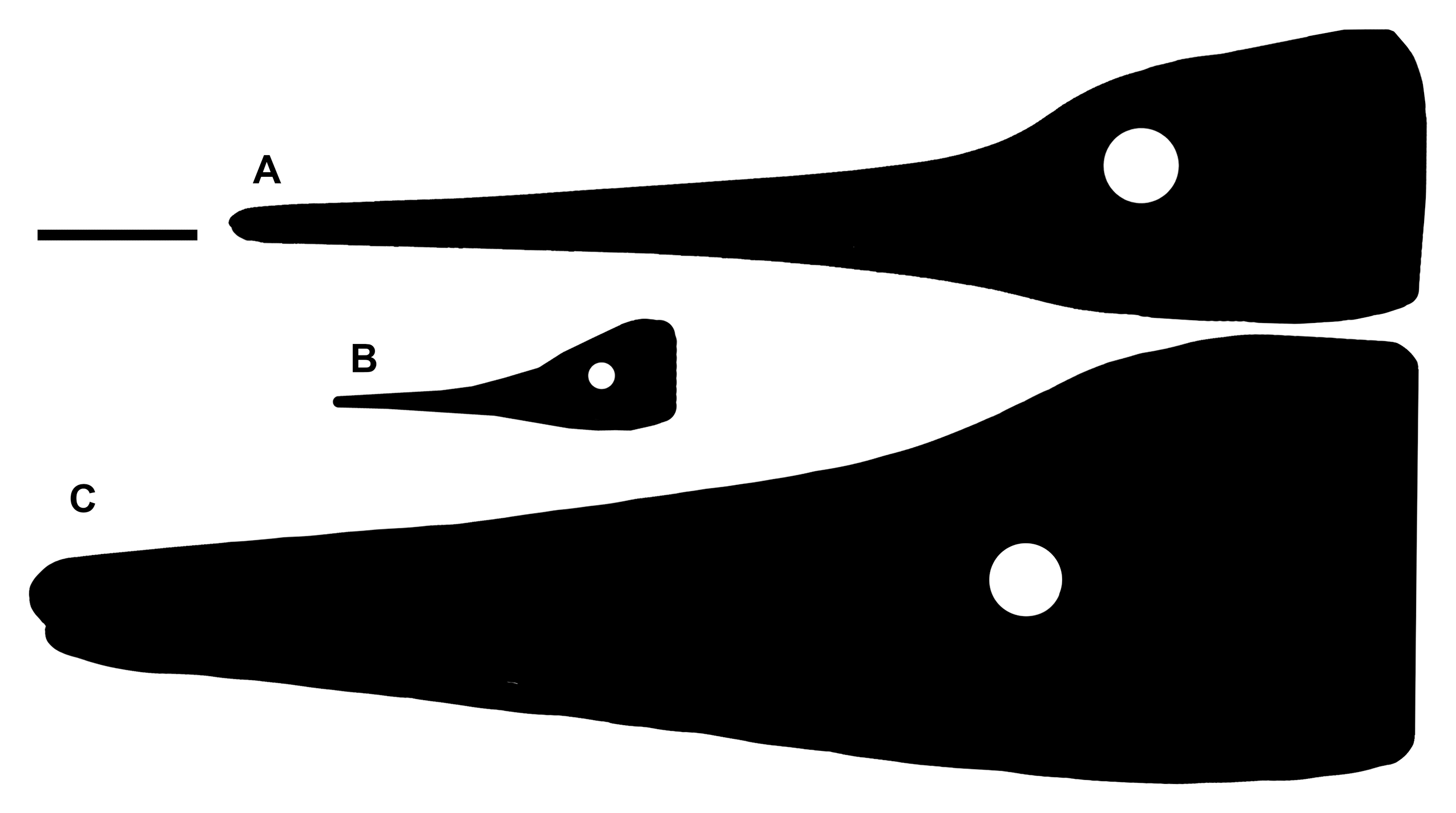
The head shape of Besanosaurus (top) compared with that of the contemporaneous Mixosaurus (middle) and Cymbospondylus (bottom)

Besanosaurus is one of a variety of ichthyosaurs from the Besano Formation. These different species would have had different feeding strategies to avoid competition. Cymbospondylus buchseri is known to have fed on coleoids, but its strong snout indicates that it could have taken larger prey with powerful bites, meaning it may have been an apex predator. The stomach contents of Mixosaurus cornalianus show the remains of small coleoids and fish, suggesting that it would have gone after smaller prey than its larger relatives. The rarer mixosaurids Mixosaurus kuhnschnyderi and Phalarodon are also known from Monte San Giorgio; both possess broad crushing teeth. M. kuhnschnyderi is understood to have consumed coleoids, while the larger teeth of Phalarodon may have been suited for crushing prey items with external shells. The abundance of ichthyosaurs in the middle Besano Formation correlates with when the lagoon was deepest.

Various sauropterygians are known from the Besano Formation, including the shell-crushing placodonts Paraplacodus and Cyamodus as well as pachypleurosaurs and nothosaurids. The pachypleurosaur Odoiporosaurus is known from the middle Besano Formation, while the particularly abundant Serpianosaurus did not appear until the upper portion of the formation, when ichthyosaurs were much less common. Nothosaurids from the Besano Formation consist of Silvestrosaurus buzzii, Nothosaurus giganteus, and an additional species of Nothosaurus, potentially N. juvenilis. While rare, N. giganteus may have been an apex predator like Cymbospondylus. Besides ichthyosaurs and sauropterygians, marine reptiles in the Besano Formation are represented by the thalattosaurs Askeptosaurus, Clarazia, and Hescheleria in addition to the semiaquatic, long-necked Tanystropheus.

== See also ==
- List of ichthyosaurs
- Timeline of ichthyosaur research
