= Delphinosaurus =

Delphinosaurus Temporal range: Early-Late Cretaceous, 103–98 Ma

Scientific classification
- Kingdom: Animalia
- Phylum: Chordata
- Order: †Ichthyosauria
- Family: †Ophthalmosauridae
- Genus: †Delphinosaurus; Eichwald, 1853

Type species
- †Delphinosaurus kiprijanoffi Eichwald, 1853

Dubious extinct genus of reptiles

Delphinosaurus is a dubious genus of ophthalmosaurid ichthyosaur from Albian-Cenomanian deposits in the Kursk region of European Russia.

Merriam (1905) erected Delphinosaurus for the Late Triassic ichthyosaur Shastasaurus perrini from California, but because Delphinosaurus was already in use, the replacement name Californosaurus was erected.

== Classification ==
Karl Eduard von Eichwald (1853) erected Delphinosaurus for eight mandible fragments, twelve teeth, one rib, two centra, one humerus and one epipodial from the iron-rich sands of the Kursk area dating to the Albian–Cenomanian boundary. He classified the remains as those of amphibians, because of the presence of dolphin and reptile features, suggesting an intermediate form in between these groups, hence the name. Later, however, he recognized Delphinosaurus as being an ichthyosaur in an 1865 monograph.

In the supplementary material for their paper explaining the extinction of ichthyosaurs, Fischer et al. (2016) treated Delphinosaurus as a dubious genus of ophthalmosaurid, raising the possibility that the hypodigm for D. kiprijanoffi is composite due to some teeth resembling Sisteronia, and the humerus being morphologically distinct from Sisteronia.

== See also ==
- List of ichthyosaurs
- Timeline of ichthyosaur research
