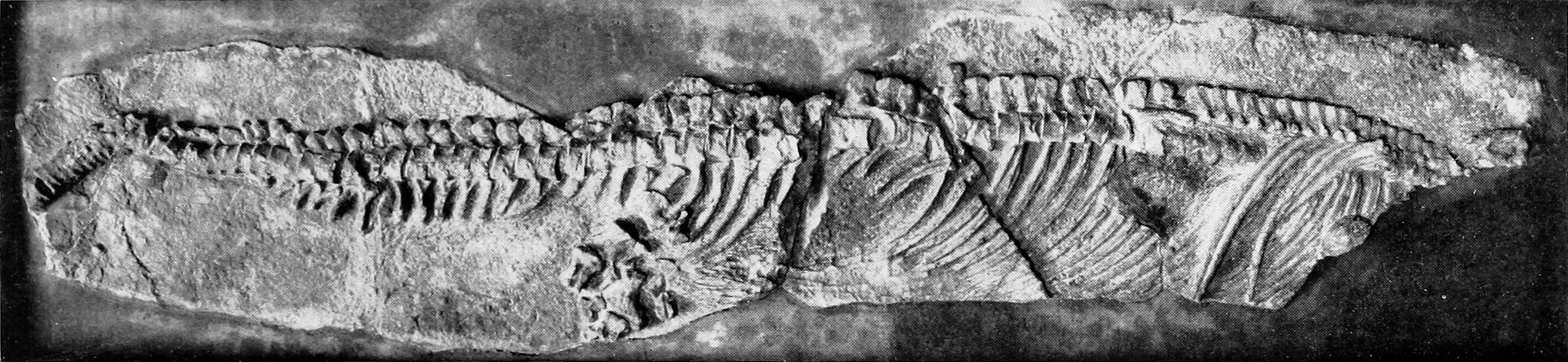
- Holotype skeleton

Scientific classification
- Kingdom: Animalia
- Phylum: Chordata
- Class: Reptilia
- Order: †Ichthyosauria
- Clade: †Euichthyosauria
- Genus: †Californosaurus; Kuhn, 1934

Type species
- †Californosaurus perrini Kuhn, 1934

Synonyms
- Shastasaurus perrini Merriam, 1902

= Californosaurus =

Californosaurus Temporal range: 237–210 Ma Middle-Late Triassic

Extinct genus of reptiles

Californosaurus ('California lizard') is an extinct genus of ichthyosaur, an extinct marine reptile, from the Lower Hosselkus Limestone (Carnian, Late Triassic) of California, and also the Muschelkalk (Ladinian, Middle Triassic) of Germany.

== Taxonomy ==
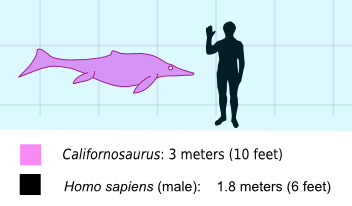
Size comparison

John Campbell Merriam (1902) described it as a new species of Shastasaurus, S. perrini, honouring Professor James Perrin Smith as discoverer, based on holotype UCMP 9119. He later recognized the species as generically distinct from the Shastasaurus type species, in 1905 erecting Delphinosaurus for S. perrini. However, Delphinosaurus had in 1853 by Eichwald been previously used for an ophthalmosaurid from Albian-Cenomanian deposits in European Russia, Delphinosaurus kiprijanoffii, and Oscar Kuhn (1934) provided the generic replacement name Californosaurus. Merriam (1938) independently erected Perrinosaurus to replace Delphinosaurus, but this is a junior objective synonym.

== Description ==
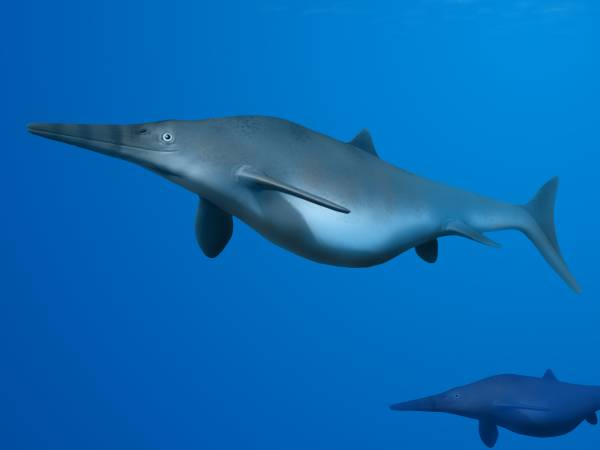
Life reconstruction

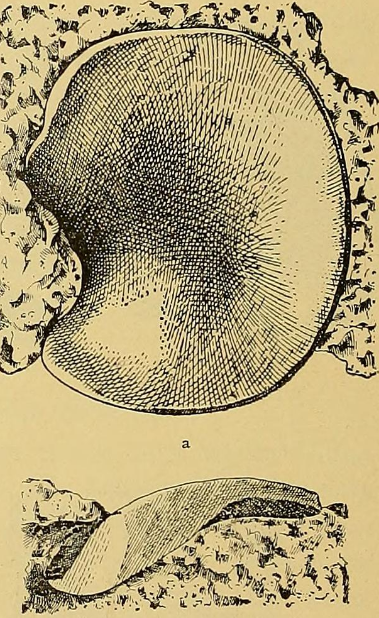
Scapula from Germany that was previously allied with aff. Delphinosaurus

The long-snouted head is small in comparison with the rest of the body, as in basal ichthyosaurs such as Mixosaurus and Cymbospondylus. The tail is sharply turned downwards, in common with more advanced ichthyosaurs, with a small vertical fluke. It may have had a small dorsal fin. There is a small number of pre-sacral vertebrae (45 or 50). The phalanges (digit bones) are circular and widely spaced, giving the flipper a round appearance. It was a medium-sized ichthyosaur, measuring up to 3 m (9.8 ft) long.

== Biology ==
It fed on fish and other small marine creatures. Like other ichthyosaurs it probably never ventured onto dry land, and gave birth in the water.

== See also ==
- List of ichthyosaurs
- Timeline of ichthyosaur research
