= The Castle (Capitol Reef National Park) =

Summit in Utah, United States

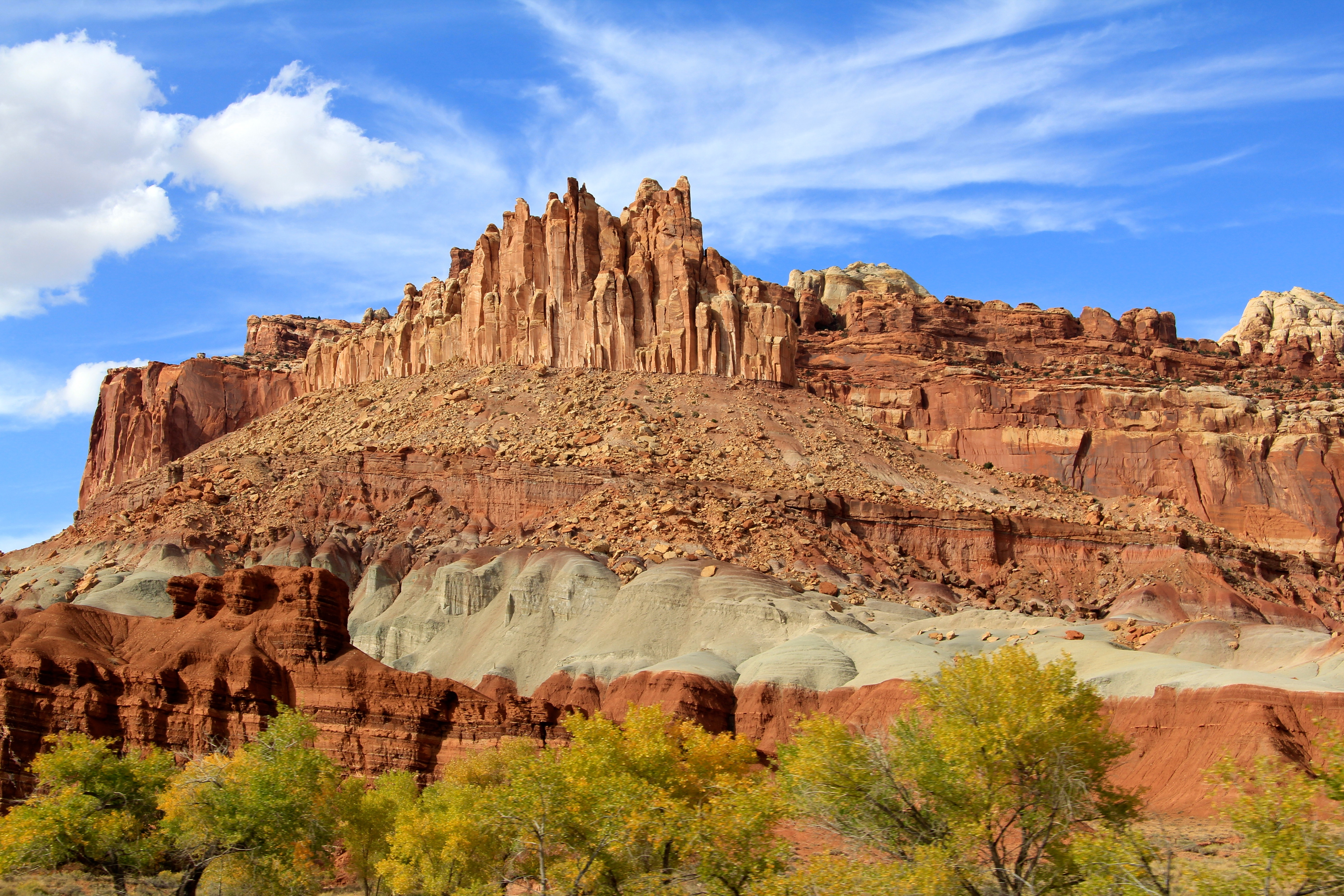
- The Castle, south aspect, October 2012

Highest point
- Elevation: 6,387 ft (1,947 m)
- Prominence: 327 ft (100 m)
- Parent peak: Peak 6700
- Isolation: 0.52 mi (0.84 km)
- Coordinates: 38°17′55″N 111°15′51″W

Geography
- Location within Utah Location within the United States
- Country: United States
- State: Utah
- County: Wayne
- Protected area: Capitol Reef National Park
- Parent range: Colorado Plateau
- Topo map: USGS Twin Rocks

Geology
- Rock age: Triassic
- Rock type: Wingate Sandstone

Climbing
- Easiest route: class 5+ climbing

The Castle is a 6,387-foot (1,947 m) summit in Capitol Reef National Park in Wayne County, Utah, United States. This iconic landmark is situated 0.5 mi (0.80 km) immediately north of the park's visitor center, towering nearly 800 feet (240 m) above the center and Utah State Route 24. Precipitation runoff from this feature is drained by tributaries of the Fremont River.

== Geology ==
The uppermost portion of The Castle is composed of hard, jointed Wingate Sandstone, which is great for rock climbing, and is believed to have formed about 200 million years ago. This overlays the exposed gray-green layer of the Chinle Formation which was laid down as volcanic ash about 225 million years ago, and beneath Chinle is the Moenkopi Formation (about 245 million years old), all of which date to the Triassic. Long after the sedimentary rocks were deposited, the Colorado Plateau was uplifted relatively evenly, keeping the layers roughly horizontal, but Capitol Reef is an exception because of the Waterpocket Fold, a classic monocline, which formed between 50 and 70 million years ago during the Laramide Orogeny.

== Gallery ==
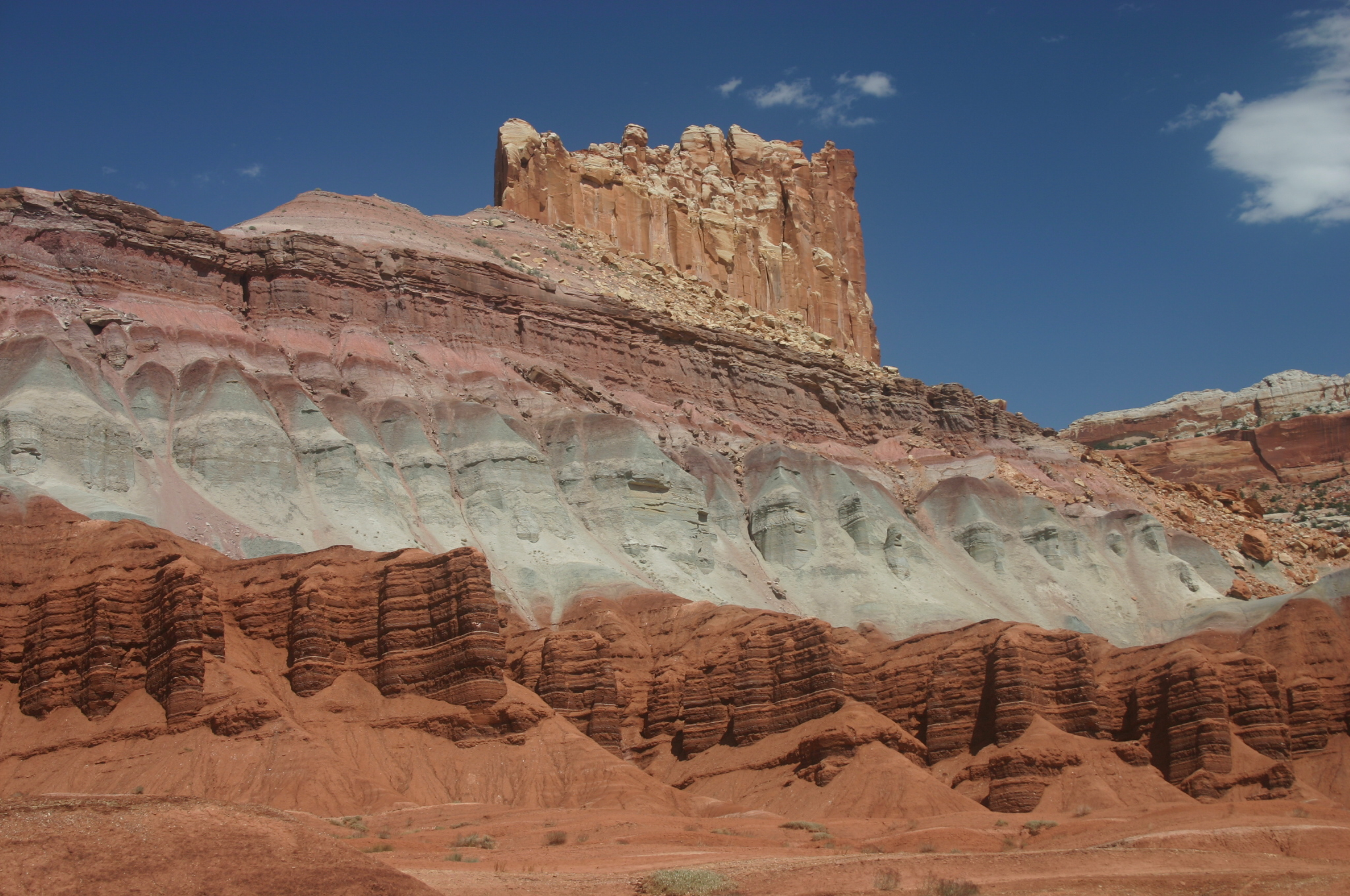
West aspect. Grayish strata is Chinle Formation, brown layer (bottom) is Moenkopi

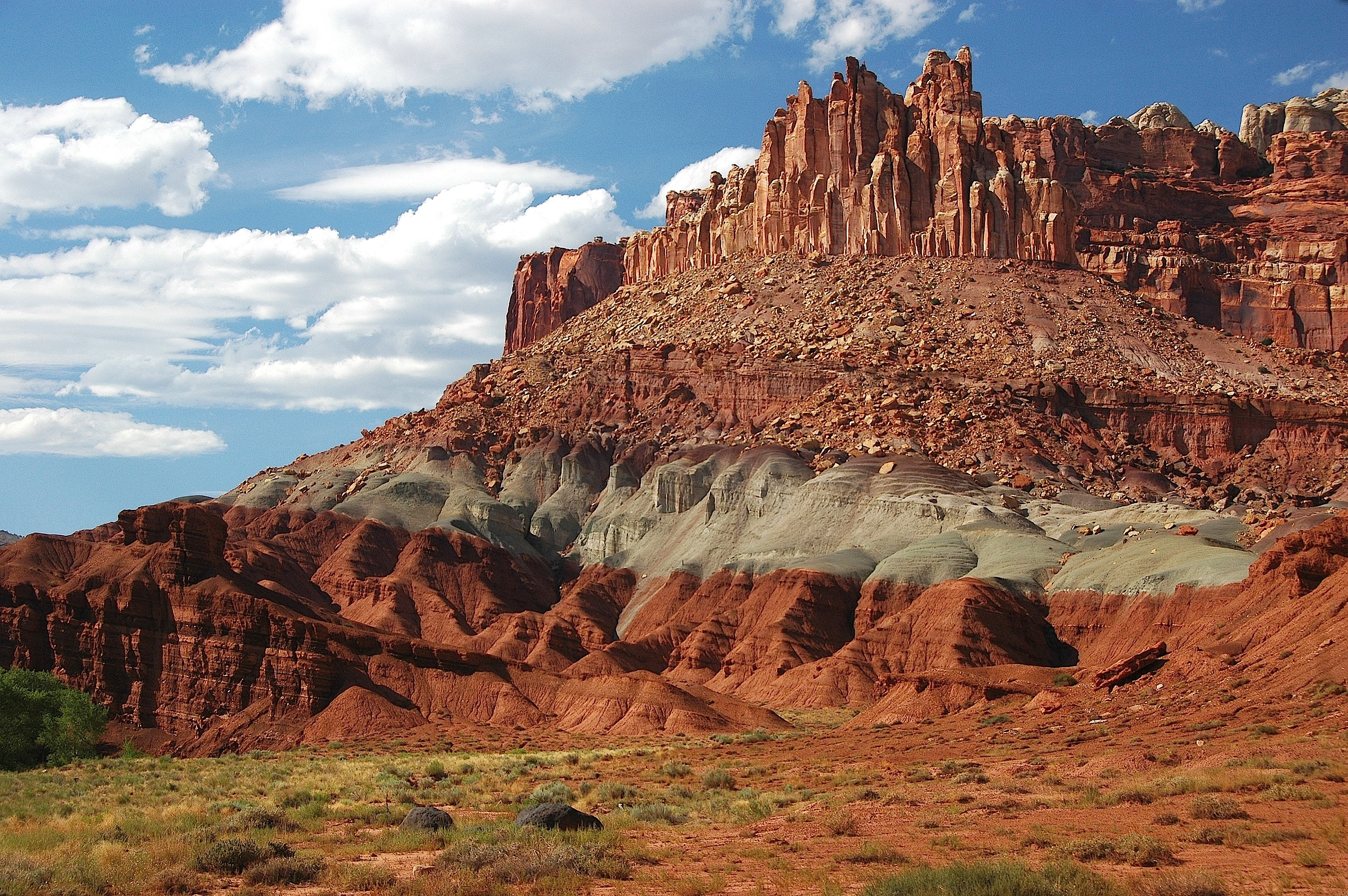

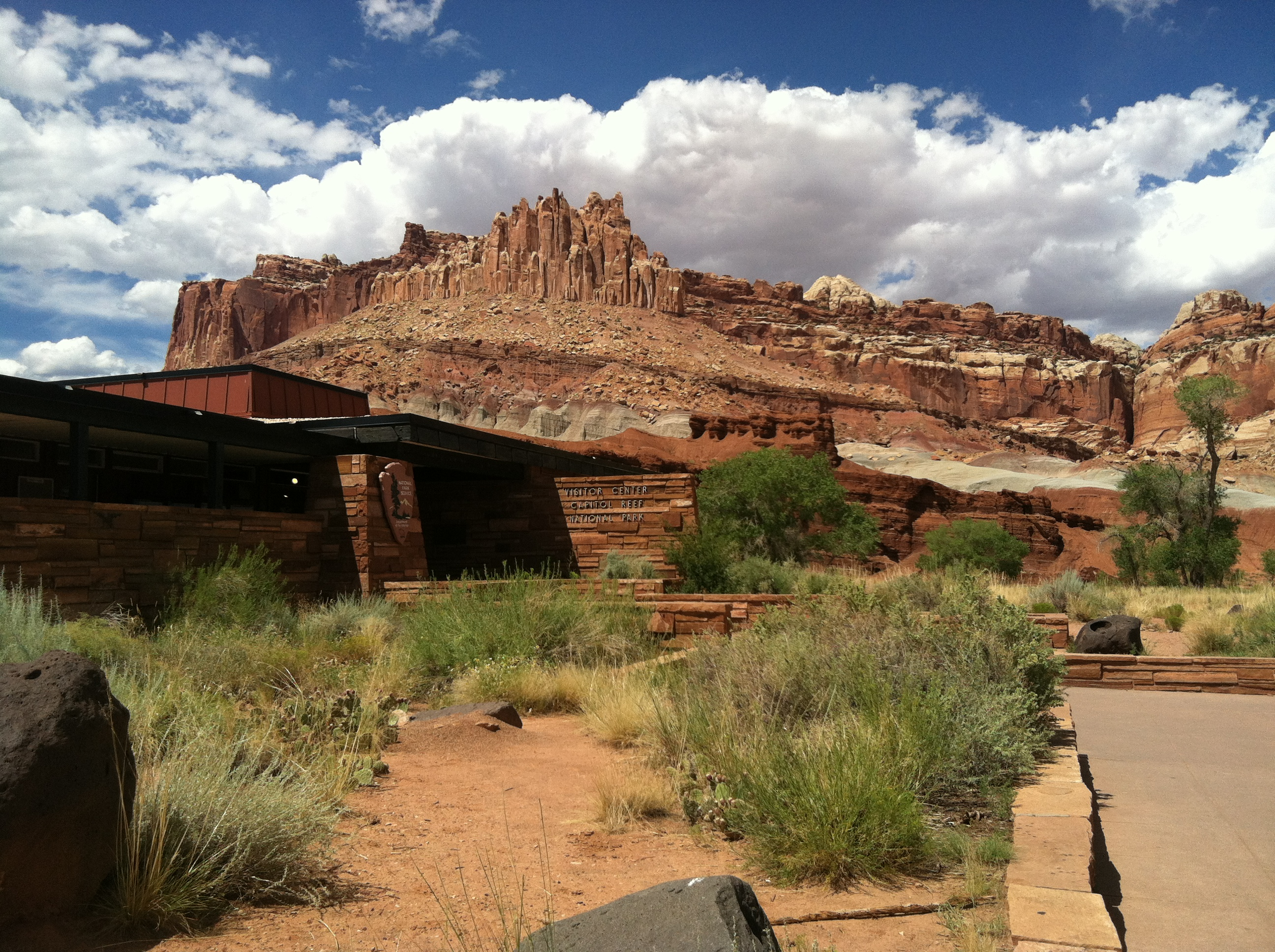

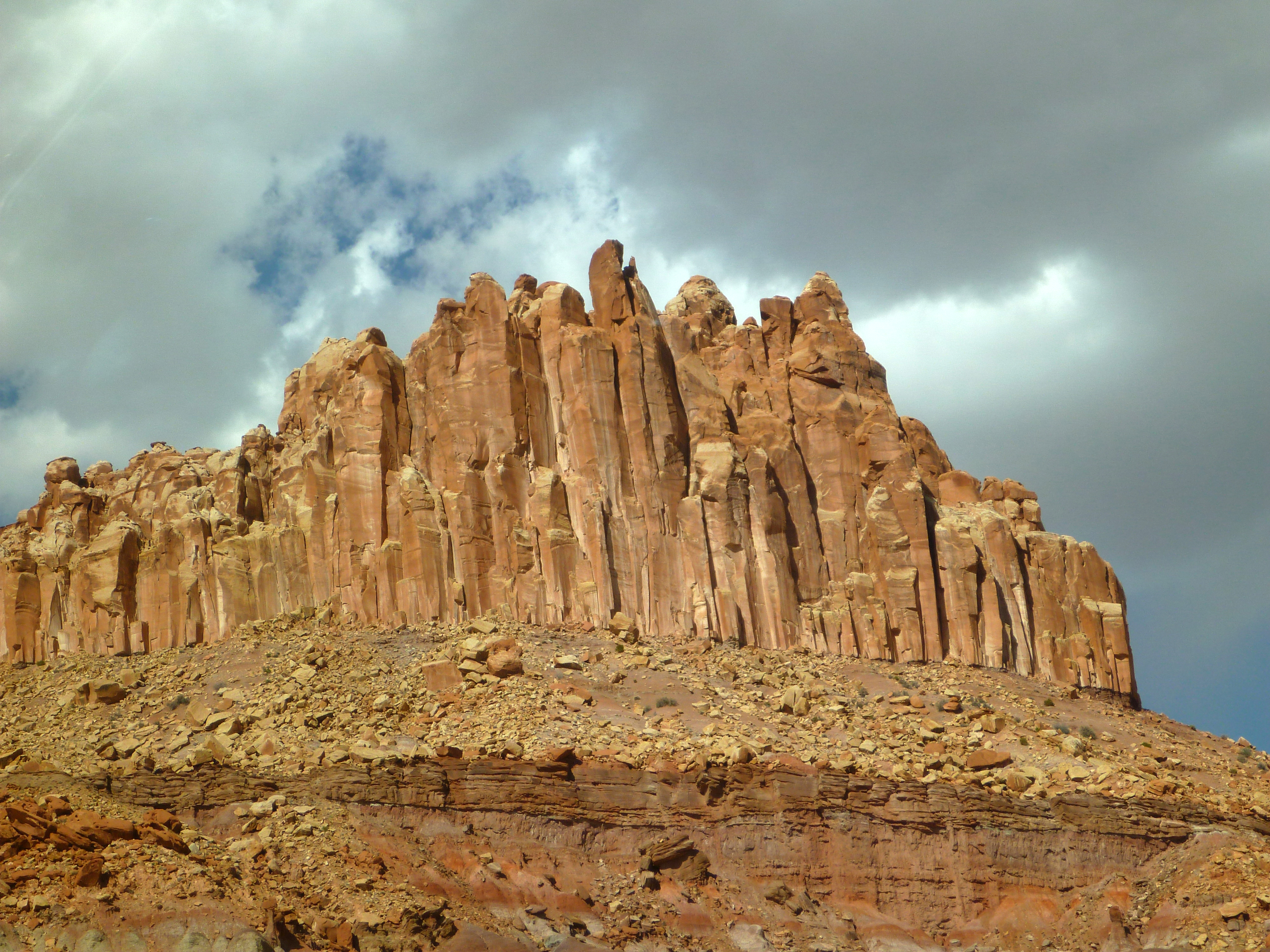

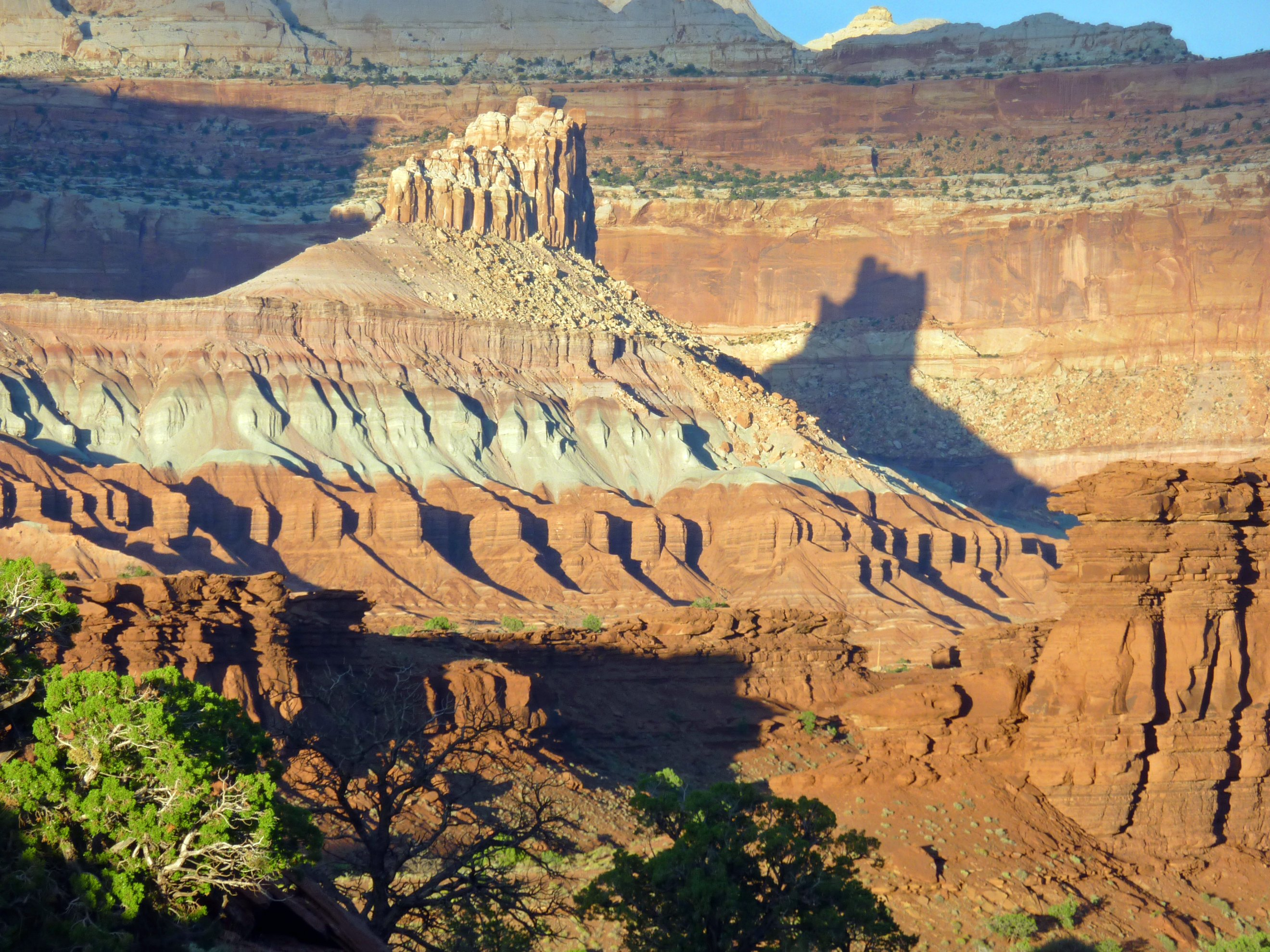
Casting shadow at sunset, from Sunset Point

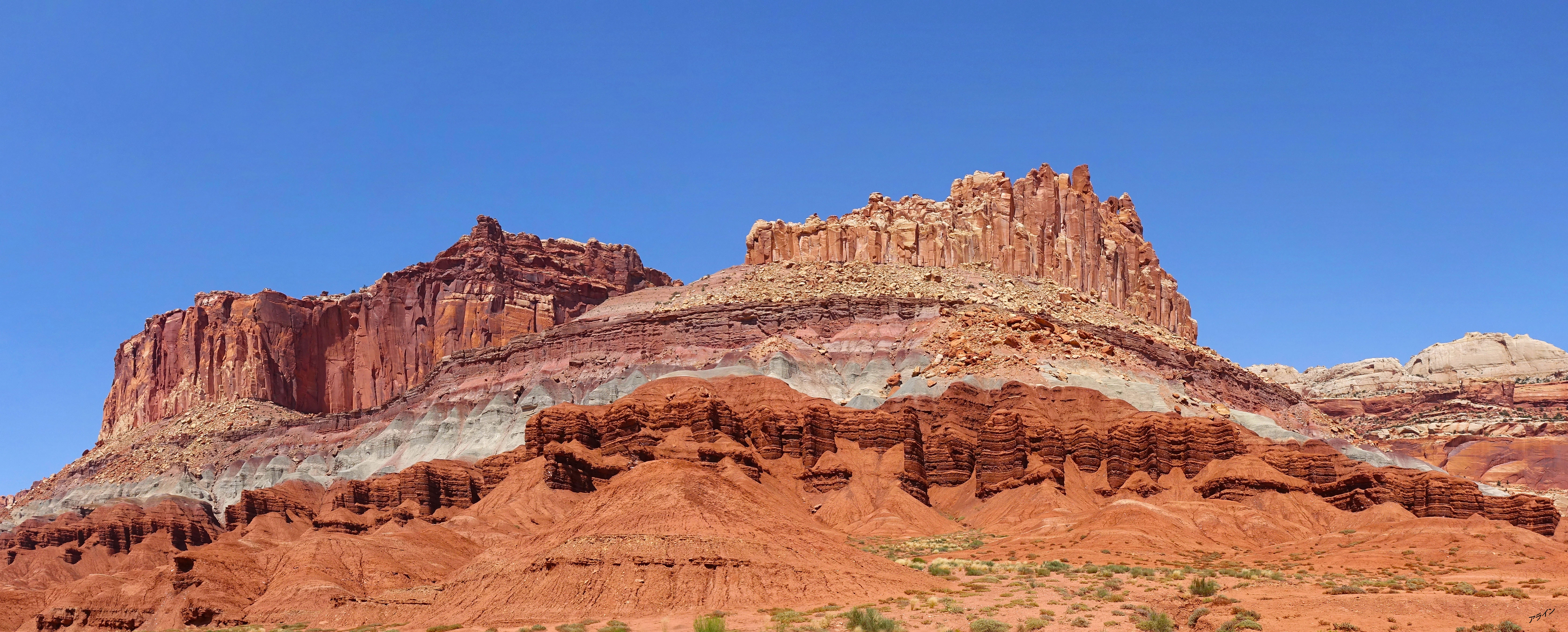

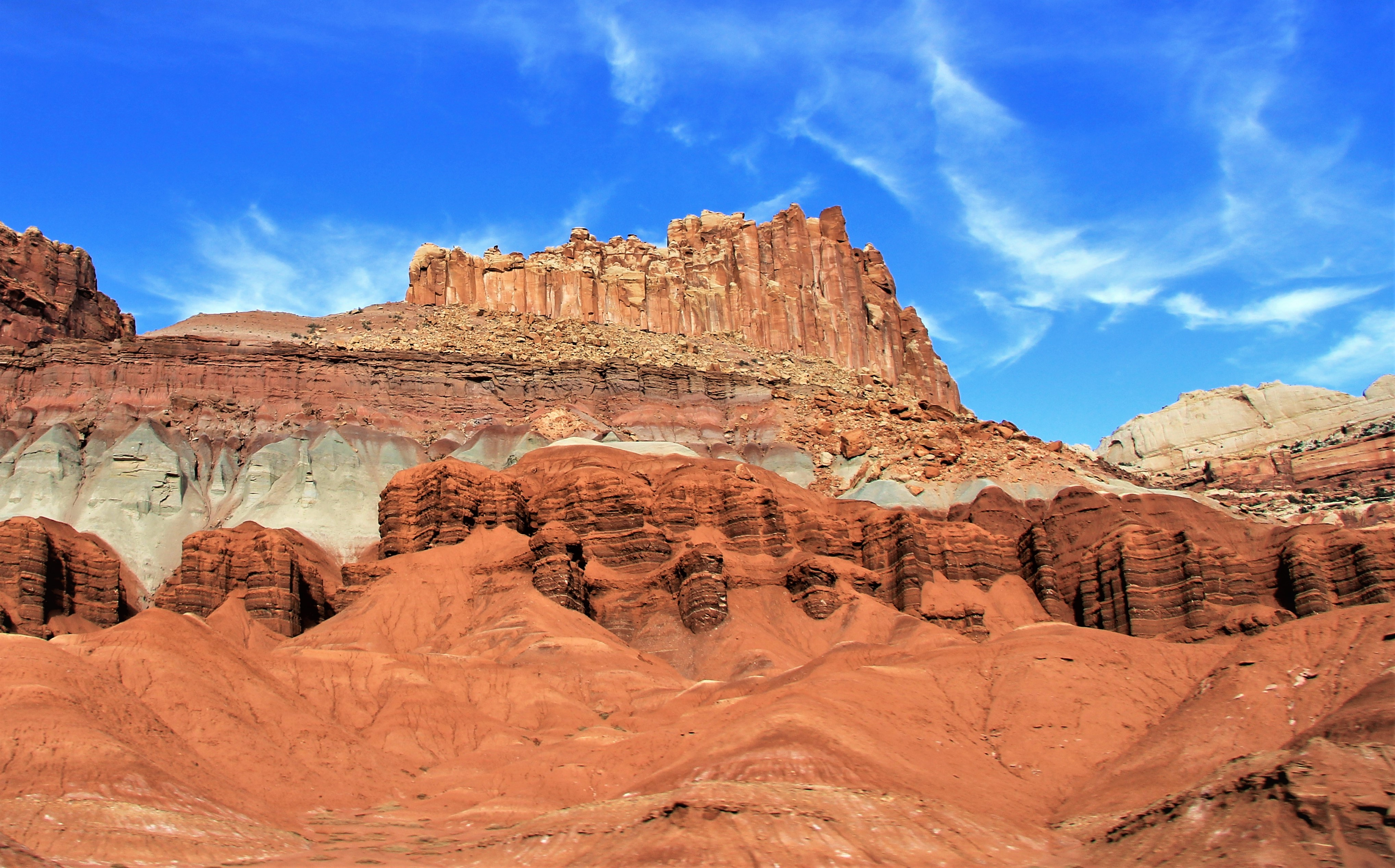

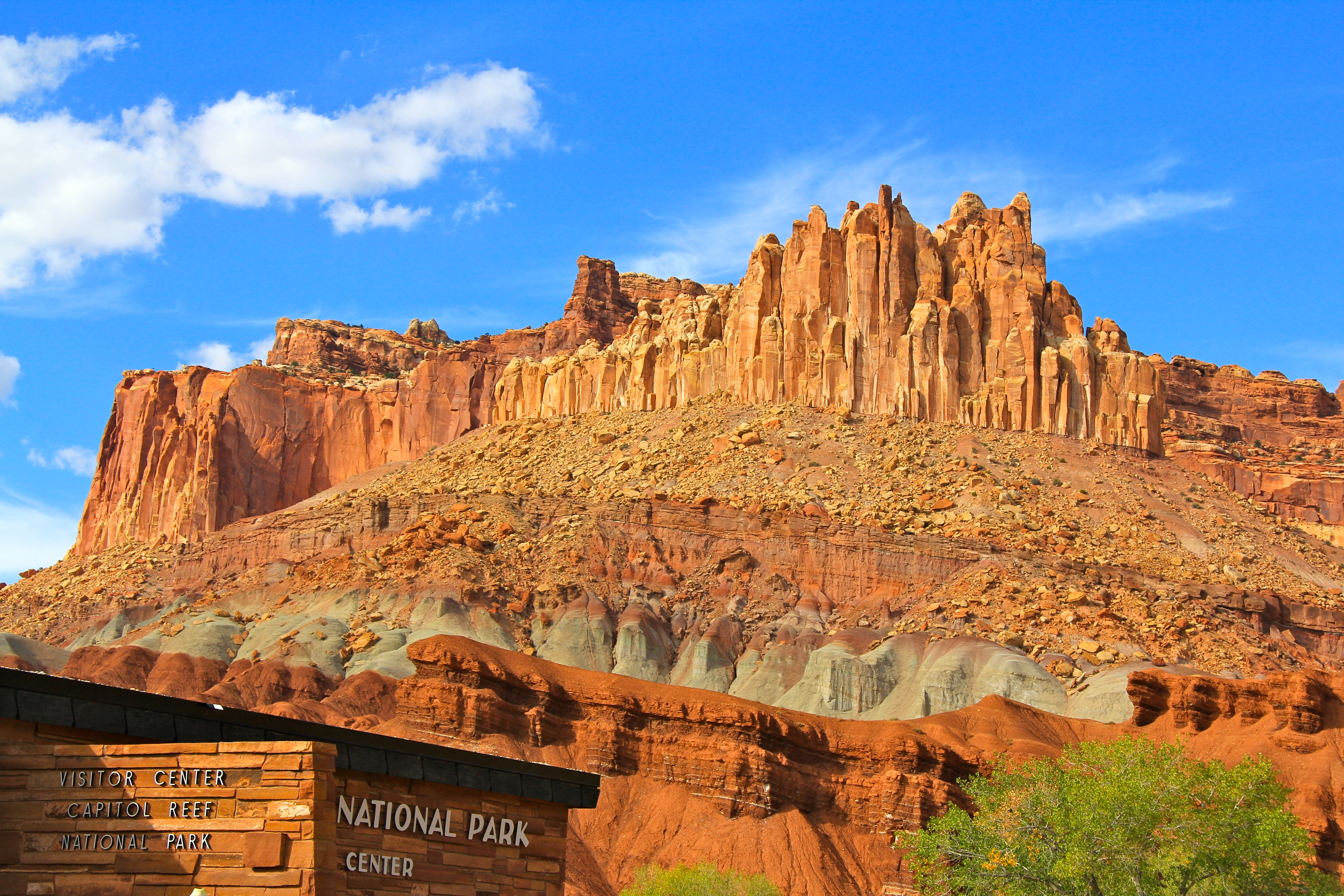
From visitor center

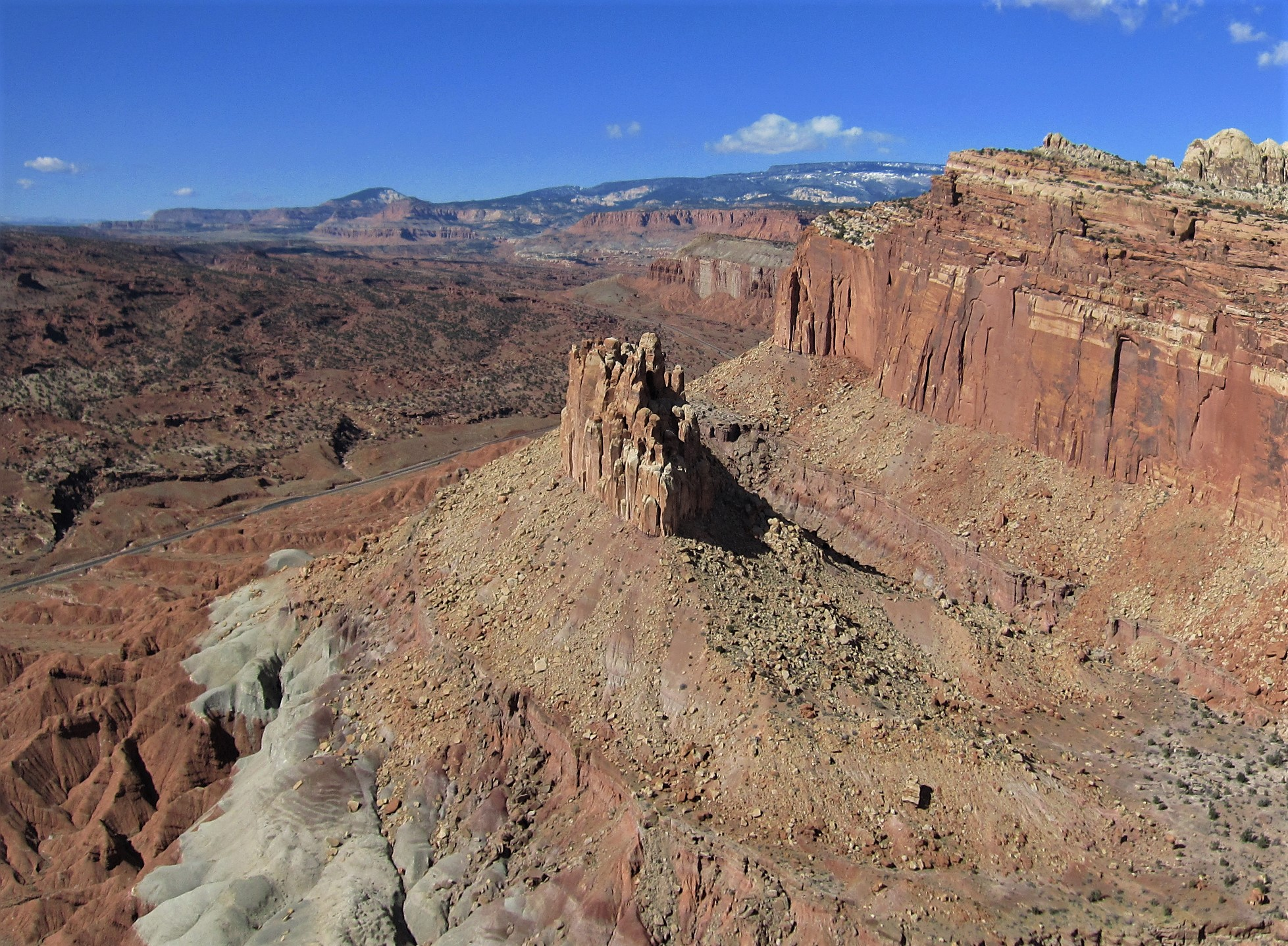
Looking down at The Castle, from the east.

== Climate ==
Spring and fall are the most favorable seasons to visit The Castle. According to the Köppen climate classification system, it is located in a Cold semi-arid climate zone, which is defined by the coldest month having an average mean temperature below 32 °F (0 °C), and at least 50% of the total annual precipitation being received during the spring and summer. This desert climate receives less than 10 inches (250 millimeters) of annual rainfall, and snowfall is generally light during the winter.

Climate data for Capitol Reef Visitor Center, elevation 5,653 ft (1,723 m), 1981–2010 normals, extremes 1981–2019
Month	Jan	Feb	Mar	Apr	May	Jun	Jul	Aug	Sep	Oct	Nov	Dec	Year
Record high °F (°C)	58.6 (14.8)	68.3 (20.2)	78.3 (25.7)	84.4 (29.1)	94.6 (34.8)	100.2 (37.9)	100.8 (38.2)	97.9 (36.6)	95.4 (35.2)	86.1 (30.1)	70.4 (21.3)	61.5 (16.4)	100.8 (38.2)
Mean daily maximum °F (°C)	40.6 (4.8)	46.4 (8.0)	54.7 (12.6)	65.0 (18.3)	74.5 (23.6)	85.3 (29.6)	90.4 (32.4)	87.9 (31.1)	80.2 (26.8)	66.1 (18.9)	51.3 (10.7)	40.6 (4.8)	65.3 (18.5)
Mean daily minimum °F (°C)	17.8 (−7.9)	22.7 (−5.2)	30.2 (−1.0)	36.2 (2.3)	44.7 (7.1)	53.1 (11.7)	60.4 (15.8)	58.5 (14.7)	50.4 (10.2)	39.0 (3.9)	27.6 (−2.4)	18.2 (−7.7)	38.3 (3.5)
Record low °F (°C)	−4.2 (−20.1)	−11.8 (−24.3)	9.1 (−12.7)	18.1 (−7.7)	27.2 (−2.7)	34.6 (1.4)	42.4 (5.8)	45.1 (7.3)	29.9 (−1.2)	11.7 (−11.3)	8.0 (−13.3)	−7.5 (−21.9)	−11.8 (−24.3)
Average precipitation inches (mm)	0.52 (13)	0.34 (8.6)	0.53 (13)	0.47 (12)	0.59 (15)	0.47 (12)	0.91 (23)	1.20 (30)	0.80 (20)	0.98 (25)	0.49 (12)	0.32 (8.1)	7.62 (194)
Average dew point °F (°C)	17.3 (−8.2)	20.8 (−6.2)	23.0 (−5.0)	24.5 (−4.2)	29.1 (−1.6)	32.0 (0.0)	40.0 (4.4)	41.8 (5.4)	34.8 (1.6)	28.2 (−2.1)	21.9 (−5.6)	17.5 (−8.1)	27.6 (−2.4)
Source: PRISM

== See also ==
- Colorado Plateau
- Geology of the Capitol Reef area
- Chimney Rock
