= Geology of the Capitol Reef area =

Geology of an area in Utah, US

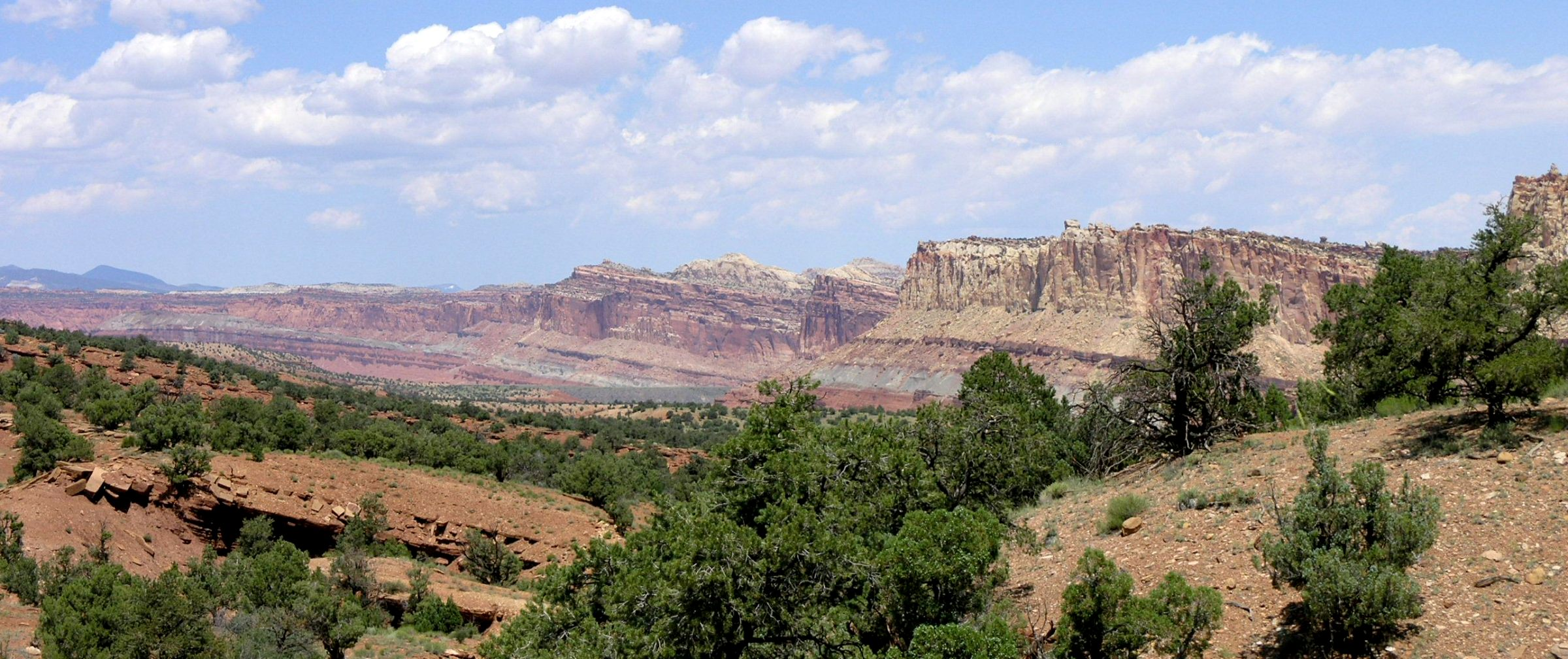
The Waterpocket Fold is the major geographic feature in the area of the park. This view is from above Capitol Reef Scenic Drive looking back at the west face of the broken and eroded fold.

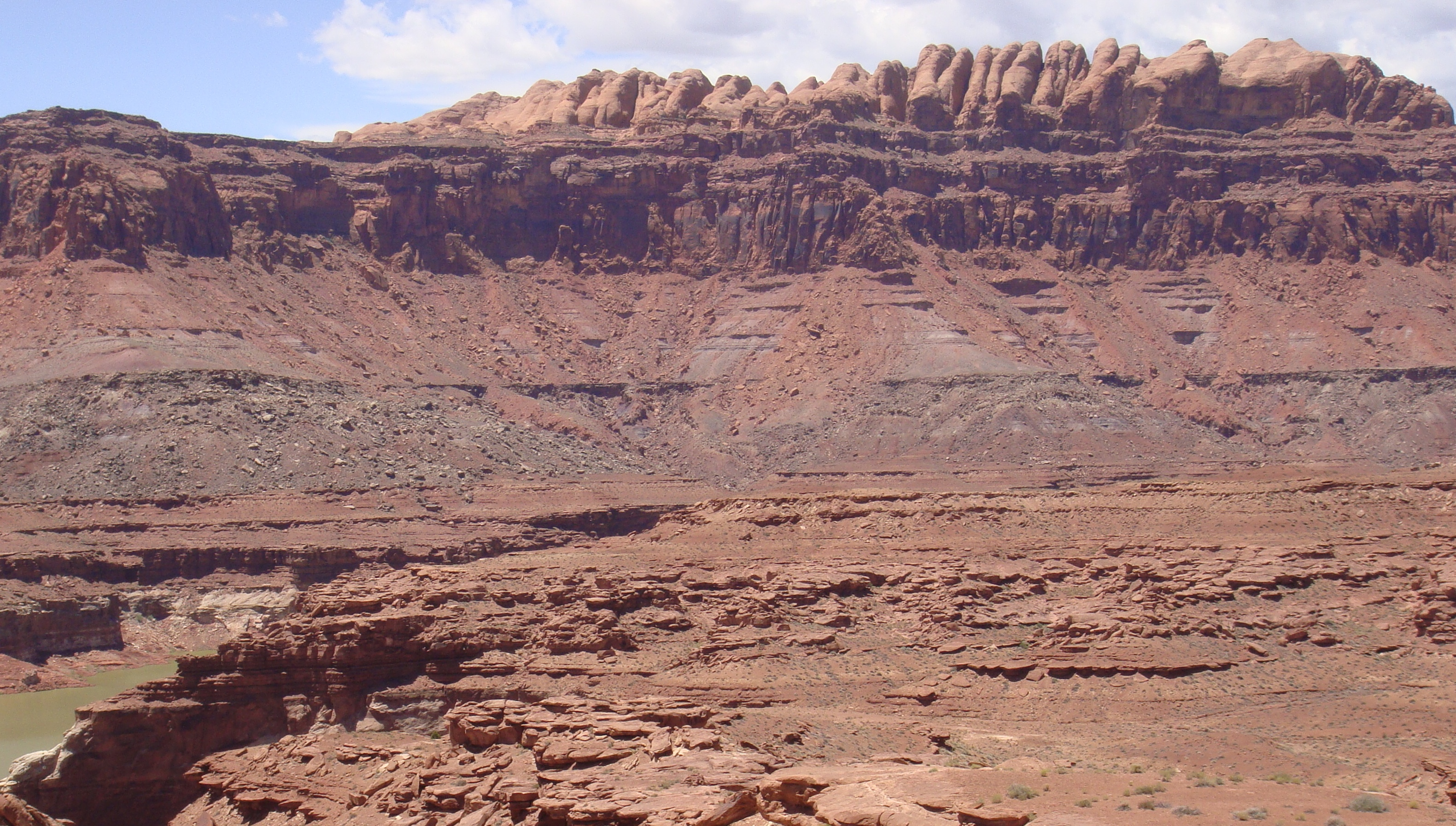
The Permian through Jurassic stratigraphy of the Colorado Plateau area of southeastern Utah that makes up much of the famous prominent rock formations in protected areas such as Capitol Reef National Park and Canyonlands National Park. From top to bottom: Rounded tan domes of the Navajo Sandstone, layered red Kayenta Formation, cliff-forming, vertically-jointed, red Wingate Sandstone, slope-forming, purplish Chinle Formation, layered, lighter-red Moenkopi Formation, and white, layered Cutler Formation sandstone. Picture from Glen Canyon National Recreation Area, Utah.

The exposed geology of the Capitol Reef area presents a record of mostly Mesozoic-aged sedimentation in an area of North America in and around Capitol Reef National Park, on the Colorado Plateau in southeastern Utah.

Nearly 10,000 feet (3,000 m) of sedimentary strata are found in the Capitol Reef area, representing nearly 200 million years of geologic history of the south-central part of the U.S. state of Utah. These rocks range in age from Permian (as old as 270 million years old) to Cretaceous (as young as 80 million years old.) Rock layers in the area reveal ancient climates as varied as rivers and swamps (Chinle Formation), Sahara-like deserts (Navajo Sandstone), and shallow ocean (Mancos Shale).

The area's first known sediments were laid down as a shallow sea invaded the land in the Permian. At first sandstone was deposited but limestone followed as the sea deepened. After the sea retreated in the Triassic, streams deposited silt before the area was uplifted and underwent erosion. Conglomerate followed by logs, sand, mud and wind-transported volcanic ash were later added. Mid to Late Triassic time saw increasing aridity, during which vast amounts of sandstone were laid down along with some deposits from slow-moving streams. As another sea started to return, it periodically flooded the area and left evaporite deposits. Barrier islands, sand bars and later, tidal flats, contributed sand for sandstone, followed by cobbles for conglomerate, and mud for shale. The sea retreated, leaving streams, lakes and swampy plains to become the resting place for sediments. Another sea, the Western Interior Seaway, returned in the Cretaceous and left more sandstone and shale only to disappear in the early Cenozoic.

From 70 to 50 million years ago the Laramide orogeny, a major mountain building event in western North America, created the Rocky Mountains to the east. The uplift possibly acted on a buried fault to form the area's Waterpocket Fold. More recent uplift of the entire Colorado Plateau and the resulting erosion has exposed this fold at the surface only within the last 15 to 20 million years. Ice ages in the Pleistocene increased the rate of precipitation and erosion. The cracked upper parts of the Waterpocket Fold were especially affected and the fold itself was exposed and dissected.

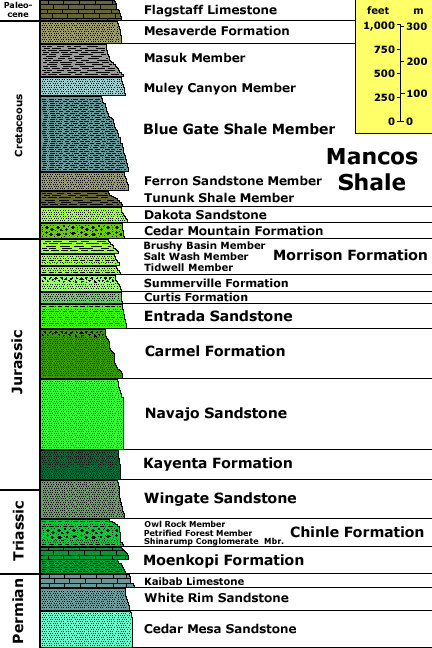
Stratigraphic section (USGS), Geologic cross section (NPS)

== Primary deposition of sediments ==
Some important concepts: A formation is a formally named and defined geologic unit with unique characteristics. Those characteristics were created during a largely unbroken period of time and result from the specific depositional environment that the formation was laid down in. A member is a minor unit in a formation and a bed is a distinct subunit of a member. Groups are sets of formations that are related in significant ways such as, for example, all being deposited during a dry period that lasted millions of years or as the result of an ocean periodically flooding the same area over millions of years.

The various kinds of unconformities are gaps in the geologic record. Such gaps can be due to a prolonged absence of deposition or due to subsequent erosion that removes previously deposited rock units. The following sections are ordered from oldest to youngest rock units in order to create a geologic history of events. This is the opposite order one would see in an actual cross section of the sediments because newer rock units are deposited on top of older ones per the law of superposition.

=== Cutler and Kaibab formations (Permian) ===
The ocean surrounding the supercontinent Pangaea is Panthalassa

In early Permian time, Utah was on a continental shelf that was occasionally covered by a shallow arm of the Panthalassa Ocean. That part of Laurasia was on a passive continental margin not unlike the current west coast of equatorial Africa. The resultant formations are part of the approximately 290- to 250-million-year-old Cutler Formation (called a group locally) Utah was nearly on the paleoequator while the first members of the Cutler Formation were deposited but it had migrated nearly to 10° north latitude by around 275 million years ago. The Cutler records sedimentation during this time and is composed of four members (youngest to oldest):

- White Rim Sandstone, (resistant caprock)
- Organ Rock Shale (locally missing),
- Cedar Mesa Sandstone, and the
- Elephant Canyon (locally buried).

Only the two sandstone members of the Cutler Formation, the Cedar Mesa and White Rim, are exposed in the park but they cannot be easily distinguished from each other and are thus often treated as a single stratigraphic unit there. The White Rim and Cedar Mesa are composed of fossilized cross-bedded sand dunes that were likely deposited in an arid coastal environment that periodically flooded with sea water. Sand in these formations are somewhat sorted by size, well-rounded (worn by abrasion), and range from very fine- to medium-grained.

Good outcrops of the locally 800 foot (240 m) thick Cedar Mesa and 420 foot (128 m) thick White Rim can be found in the bottom of Sulphur Creek and at the bottom of the Circle Cliffs outside the park's western border. In other areas the Organ Rock Shale is between the Cedar Mesa and White Rim but it pinches out east of the park. Both the locally buried Elephant Canyon and missing Organ Rock are exposed in nearby Canyonlands National Park 60 miles (100 km) east (see geology of the Canyonlands area).

Later in Permian time, the Kaibab Sea invaded the land and laid down a limey ooze that later lithified to form the locally up to 200 foot (60 m) thick Kaibab Limestone. This is the same light gray to white formation that rims the Grand Canyon to the southwest (see Geology of the Grand Canyon area). The lower parts of the Kaibab were interbedded with sand and silt before its main component, limestone, was converted into chert-rich dolomite by the intrusion of magnesium. The formation contains fossils of invertebrates including brachiopods, bryozoans, crinoids, gastropods, and pelecypods. Outcrops of the cliff-forming Kaibab in Capitol Reef can only be seen in the deeper canyons located in the westernmost part of the park. Retreat of the Kaibab Sea by the Mid Permian exposed its seabed to erosion, resulting in 100 foot (30 m) deep channels and the creation of a gap in the geologic record called an unconformity.

=== Moenkopi Formation (Triassic) ===
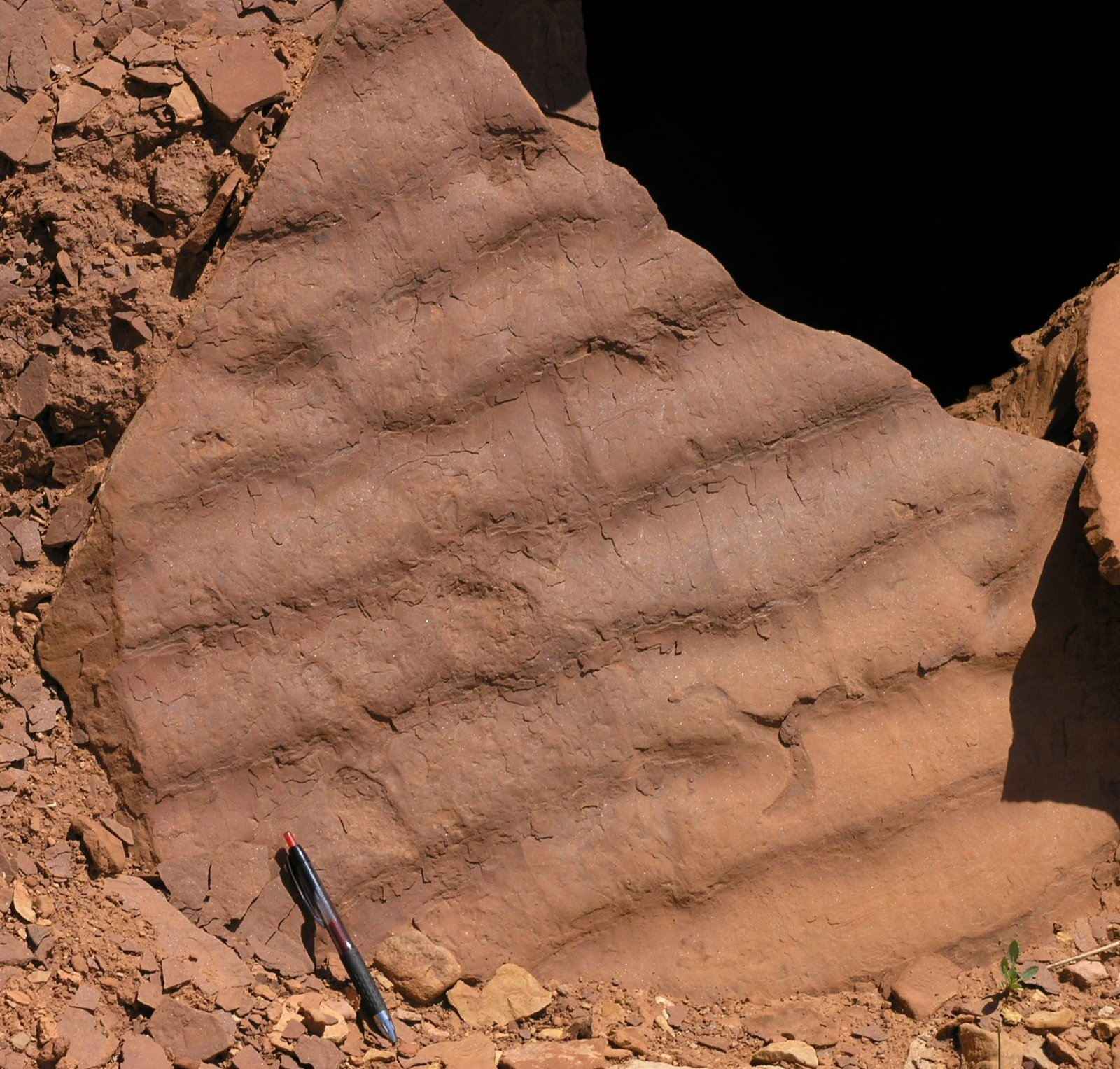
Ripple marks in Moenkopi Formation rock

Local climatic conditions were wetter and more tropical in the Early Triassic than they were previously. In the Capitol Reef area the resulting Moenkopi Formation is divided into four members (from oldest to youngest):

- Black Dragon Member
- Sinbad Limestone Member,
- Torrey Member, and
- Moody Canyon Member.

Distinctive exposures of the uppermost Moenkopi are along the lower slopes of the west-facing cliffs of the Waterpocket Fold. Uplift and subsequent partial erosion of the Moenkopi then created an approximately 6 million year long unconformity that lasted the entire Mid Triassic.

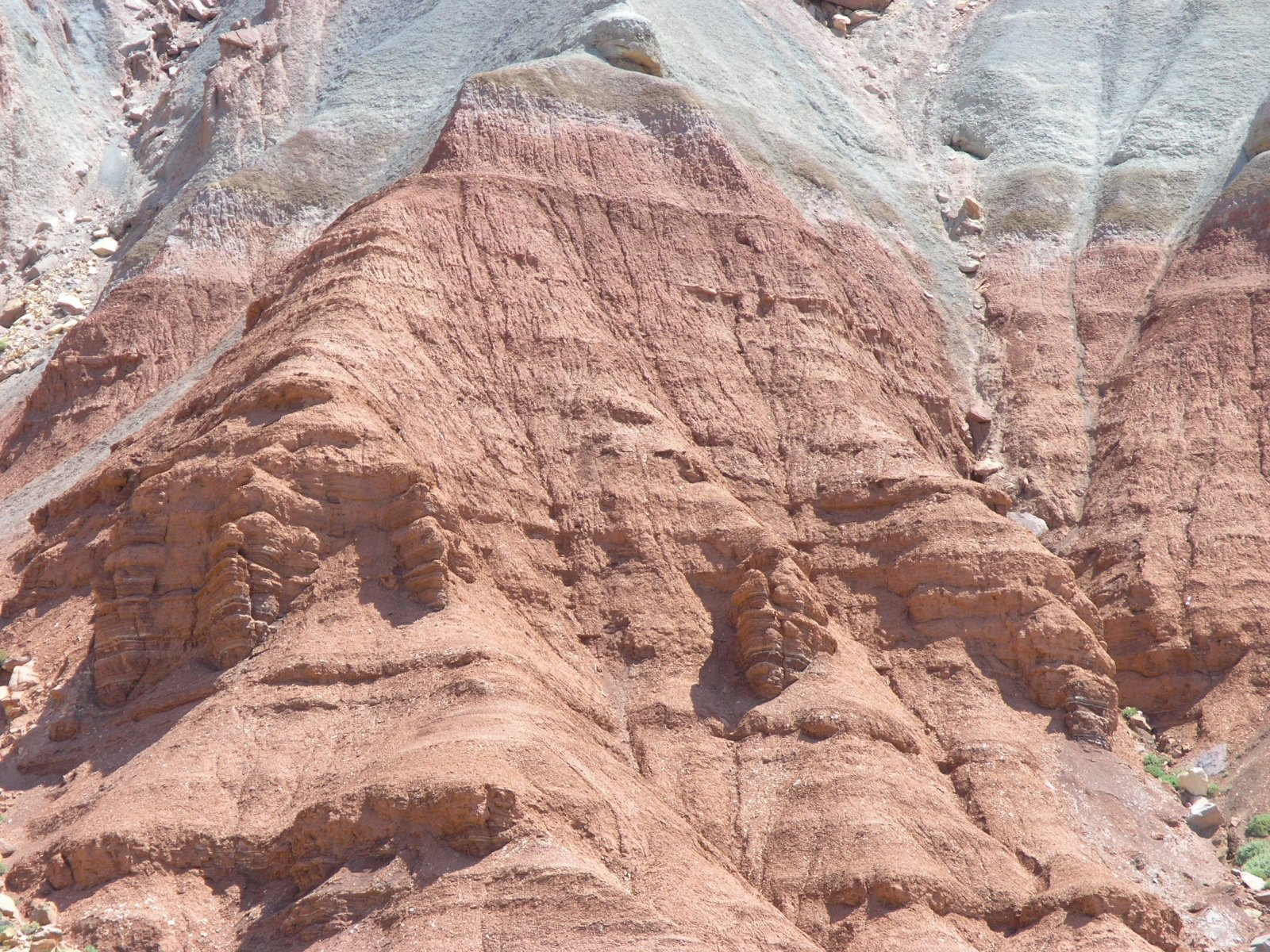
Moenkopi Formation below Chinle on cliff above Capitol Reef Scenic Drive

The 50 to 110 foot (15 to 34 m) thick slope-forming Black Dragon is composed of reddish conglomerate, sandstone, and siltstone that were likely deposited on a coastal plain followed by a tidal flat. Chert clasts from the underlying Kaibab Limestone make-up part of conglomerates at the member's base while ripple marks and mudcracks are common in its upper parts. Also common in the upper parts of the member are thin interbeds of carbonate rock with some fossils.

Later in the early Triassic, fossil-rich to muddy limey ooze with small amounts of silt and sand were laid down as a short-lived arm of the ocean covered the region. This created the locally 70 to 140 foot (21 to 43 m) thick yellowish-colored Sinbad Limestone member of the Moenkopi. Some of the fossils found in this layer include the brachiopod genus Lingula and the ammonite genus Meekoceras.

A tidal flat briefly returned to the area after the sea retreated. This created the locally 250 to 320 foot (76 to 98 m) thick reddish-brown to chocolate colored siltstone and fine-grained sandstone of the Moenkopi's Torrey Member. Some of the finer-grained beds display ripple marks and mudcracks while the sandstone has horizontal and low-angle crossbedding. Small to large fossilized track-ways from amphibians and reptiles are found in this layer as well as casts of halite.

The youngest member of the Moenkopi is the 320 to 430 foot (98 to 130 m) thick Moody Canyon Member. Moody Canyon is informally sub-divided into two units:

- a lower slope-forming 200 to 300 foot (60 to 90 m) thick unit of reddish-brown siltstone and
- an upper cliff-forming 120 to 130 foot (37 to 40 m) thick unit of reddish-orange siltstone.

About 30 to 40% of the stone in the upper unit is ripple-laminated while the lower unit is structureless to horizontally laminated. Good exposures of the ripple-laminated upper unit are found on the lower part of Egyptian Temple.

=== Chinle Formation (Triassic) ===
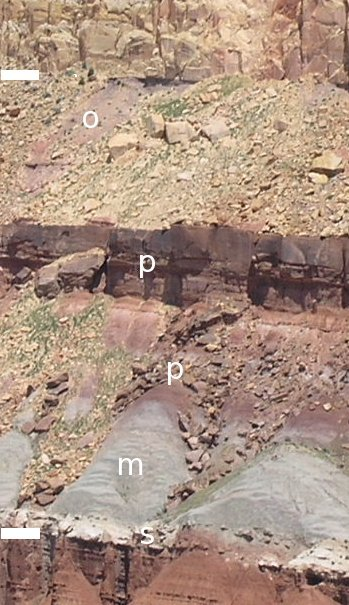
Chinle Formation section showing each member represented in the Capitol Reef area: Monitor Butte Member (m), the two units of the Petrified Forest Member (p) and the Owl Rock Member (o - partially obscured by overlaying Wingate rubble) (cropped image). Non-cropped version

A complex, relatively high velocity and likely braided stream system covered most of southern Utah in the Late Triassic. Various members of the resulting Chinle Formation are found over much of the Colorado Plateaus. Logs, sand, mud and wind-transported volcanic ash from distant eruptions were mixed by streams as they migrated over a subsiding basin to form the Chinle. Uranium salts accumulated in this formation in economically extractable quantities and petrified wood was formed (petrification was probably aided by the presence of volcanic ash). Chinle members represented in the Capitol Reef area are (from oldest to youngest):

- Shinarump Member,
- Monitor Butte Member,
- Petrified Forest Member, and
- Owl Rock Member.

Together they form the purple and orange rounded slopes and hills that are occasionally above white cliffs along the Waterpocket Fold's west face.

Discontinuous beds of sediment were deposited in broad channels eroded into the Moenkopi, creating the locally 0 to 90 foot (0 to 27 m) thick white to yellowish gray cliff-forming Shinarump Member of the Chinle Formation. The Shinarump is made of low to high-angle cross-stratified and friable fine to coarse-grained sandstone interbedded with conglomerate. Good outcrops of the Shinarump are found near the park's west entrance capping such features as the Egyptian Temple and Chimney Rock while all traces of this member are absent further east. Members above the Shinarump tend to be finer due to the slower speed of the streams that deposited them.

A river system then migrated northward and transitioned into either a large lake or marsh. As this occurred, bentonite-rich clay (formed in part from volcanic ash erupted from nearby volcanoes) and clayey cross-bedded sand with some interbeds and lenses of lime ooze were laid down. This eventually became the light purplish-gray claystone, sandstone, and carbonate rock of the Chinle's Monitor Butte Member. Burrows that measure 5 inches (13 cm) in diameter and 5 feet (1.5 m) long were excavated by lungfish into the Monitor Butte. This member easily stands out in the lower to middle slopes of the Waterpocket Fold's west face in such places as The Castle and along the cliff's just north of State Route 24 as it enters the park.

Very sinuous rivers covered the area in later Triassic time, forming the sediments of the Chinle's Petrified Forest Member. The Petrified Forest is composed of reddish-orange bentonite-rich cross-bedded siltstones and clayey fine-grained quartz sandstones. The lower part of this member forms gullied slopes and the upper part forms a resistant cliff called the 'Capitol Reef bed.' Carbonate nodules along with fossil bivalves, coprolites, marine snails, lungfish toothplates, and tetrapods are found in the Petrified Forest Member.

Deposition from a series of lakes then dominate the geologic record, resulting in the locally 150 to 200 foot (45 to 60 m) thick Owl Rock Member of the Chinle. The Owl Rock is made of purple and orange mudstones, fine-grained sandstones and siltstones with interbedded 1 to 10 foot (30 to 300 cm) thick green to mottled pink micritic and knobby limestone. Fossilized desiccation mudcracks that are up to 4 inches (10 cm) wide and 3 feet (1 m) deep are found at the very top of the Owl Rock (they were later filled with sand from the overlying Wingate Sandstone). Also found in the Owl Rock are trace fossils of cylindrical burrows and fossils of ostracodes. The Owl Rock erodes into littered slopes and is found directly below the Wingate Sandstone along the Waterpocket Fold's west face.

=== Glen Canyon Group (Triassic) ===
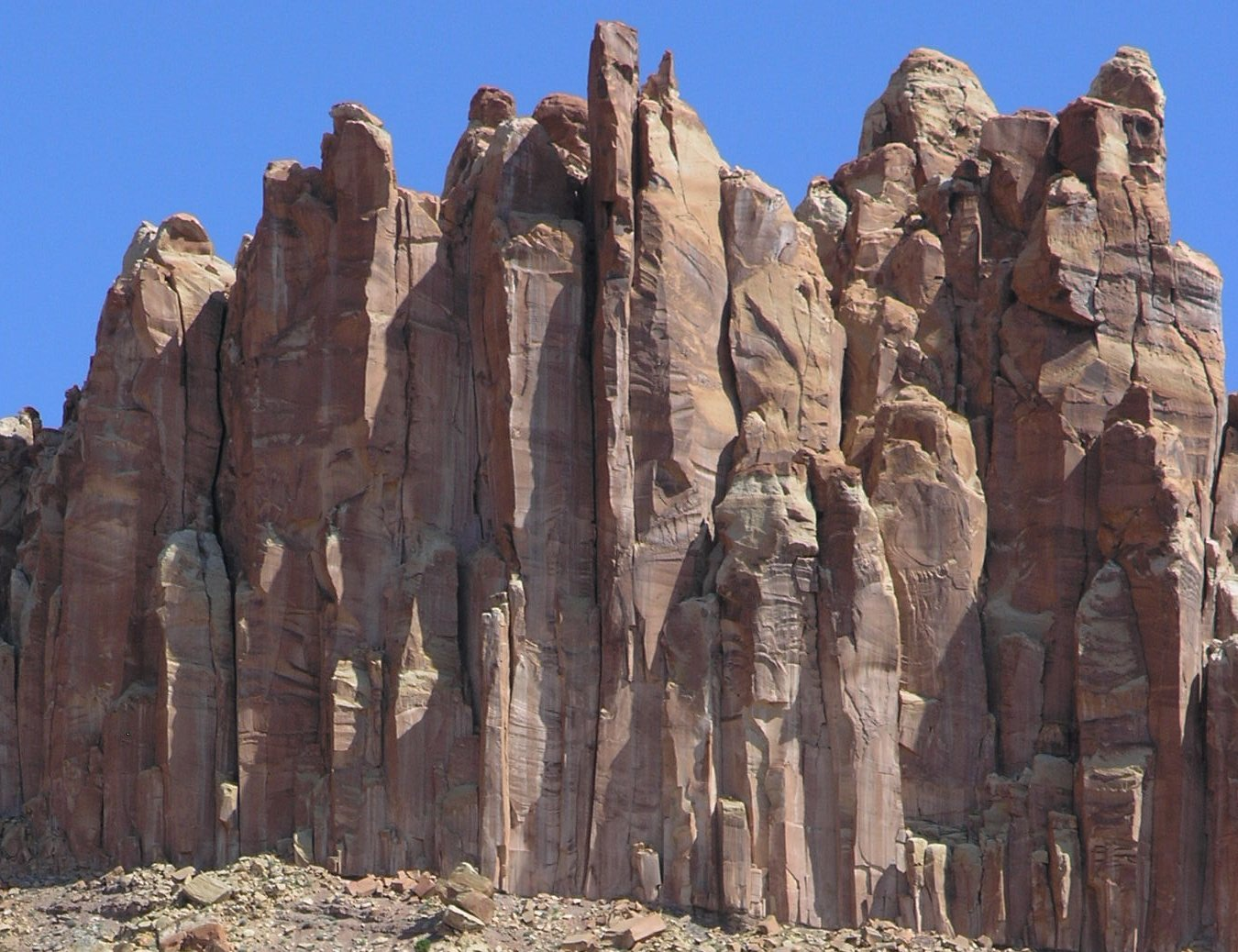
Wingate Sandstone capping The Castle (cropped image). Non-cropped version

All three formations of the Glen Canyon Group were laid down in the Mid to Late Triassic during a time of increasing aridity. Slightly clockwise and northward movement of the North American Plate was bringing the area into a dryer climatic belt. The direction of cross-bedding in Glen Canyon Group sand dunes suggests that prevailing winds from the north transported the sand into the region. Outcrops of the Glen Canyon Group's three formations are the most prominently exposed rock layers in the spine of the Waterpocket Fold. Together they reach a thickness of 1,500 to 2,700 feet (460 to 820 m) in the area and their sandstones are seen in many of the arches, domes and slot canyons in Capitol Reef. They are, from oldest (lowest) to youngest (highest);

- Wingate Sandstone
- Kayenta Formation
- Navajo Sandstone

Sand dunes migrated back and forth on the shore of the Sundance Sea, creating the 350 foot (107 m) thick cliff-forming Wingate Sandstone. This formation is composed of orange-colored cross bedded fossilized sand dunes made of fine-grained and well-rounded quartz sand. Wingate outcrops are found capping the Waterpocket Fold's western escarpment. Prominent examples are easy to see near the Visitor Center in the Fruita Cliffs and in The Castle.

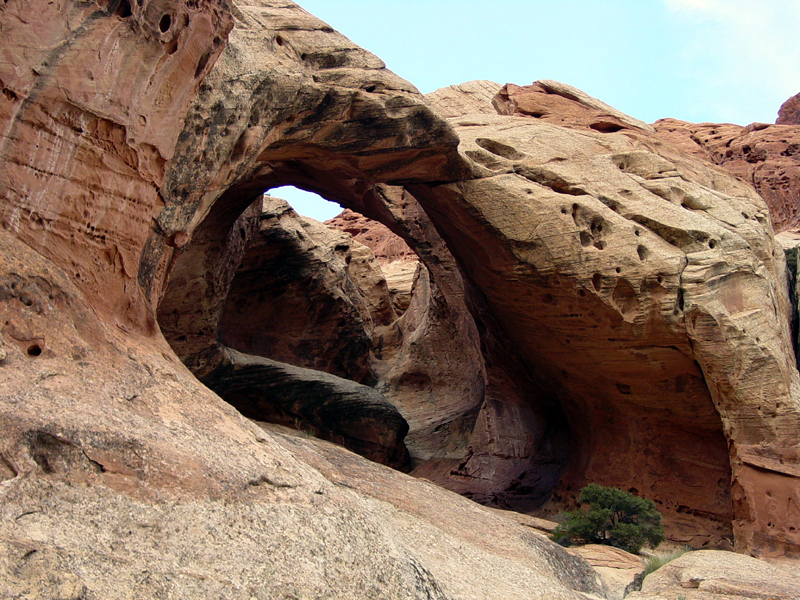
Double arch in Kayenta Formation (USGS).

The climate became more humid later in Triassic time. Slow-moving, southwestward flowing braided streams laid down thin-bedded layers of sand, silt, mud and cobbles in channels, across low flood plains and in lakes. Fossilized footprints of dinosaurs and the crocodile-like tritylodonts can be found in this 350 foot (107 m) thick ledgy-slope forming formation, called the Kayenta. The Kayenta weathers into three units; a lower ledge and middle cliff that are dominated by cross-bedded sandstone and an upper slope that has relatively more siltstone. It is often difficult to spot the contact between the Windgate and Kayenta due to their similar color and grain size. One place where the contact is easiest to discern is west of State Route 24 along the Fremont River at mile marker 82.

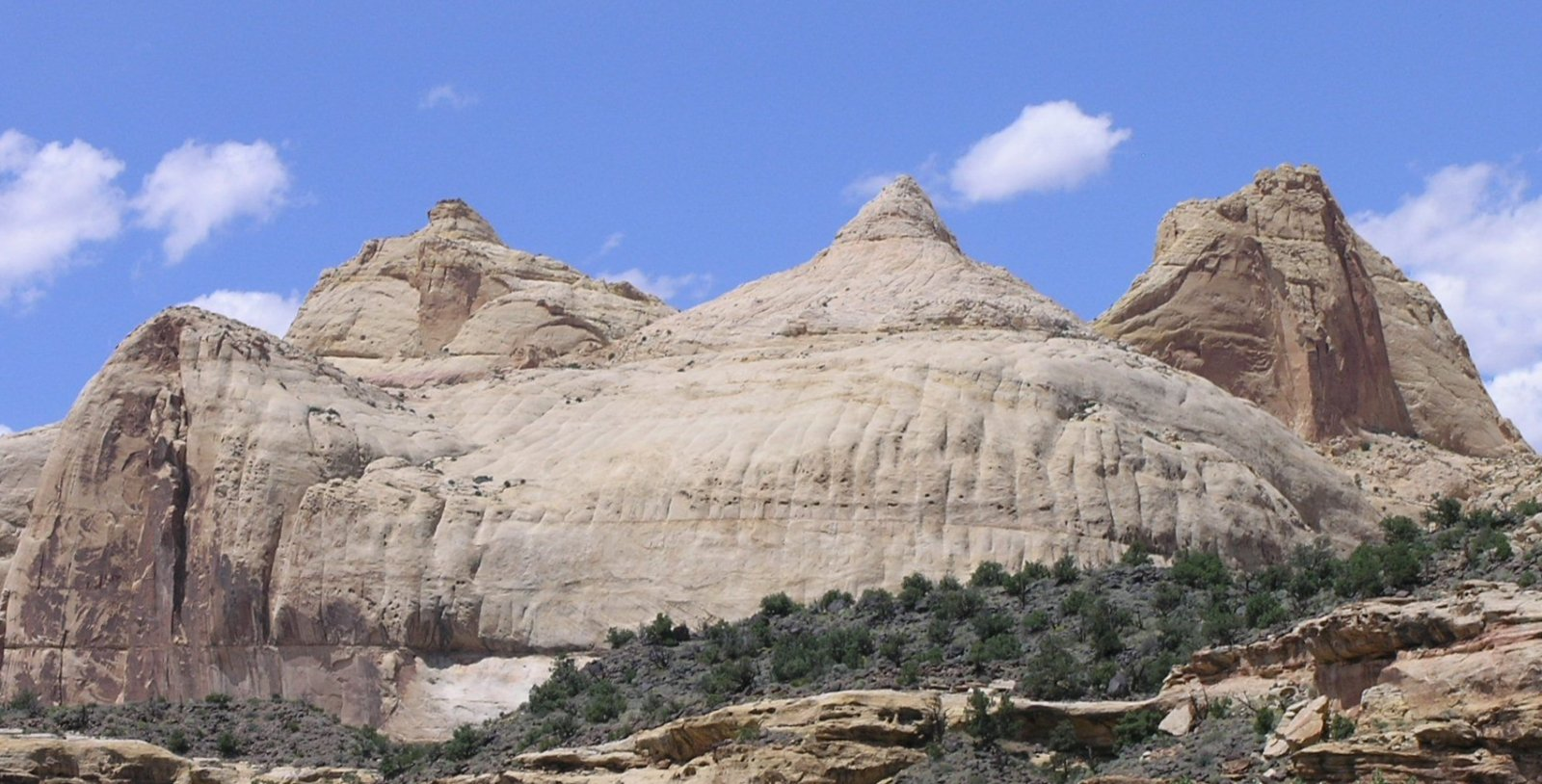
Navajo Dome is made of Navajo Sandstone

A massive Sahara-like desert geologists call an erg then invaded the area, covering it with 800 to 1,100 feet (240 to 335 m) of accumulated white to tan-colored fossilized sand dunes. The resulting formation, called the Navajo Sandstone, is composed of cross-bedded and very clean sandstone with well-rounded, generally very fine-grained and frosted sand. It reached its greatest thickness, 2,000 feet (610 m) in what is now Zion National Park (see geology of the Zion and Kolob canyons area). The cross-bedded make-up of the Navajo leads to the formation of curvilinear canyons and rounded domes such as Capitol Dome and Navajo Dome. In other places it forms massive cliffs and monoliths. Subsequent erosion leveled the tops of the sand dunes and left them in up to 60 foot (18 m) thick easy to discern layers.

=== San Rafael Group (Jurassic) ===
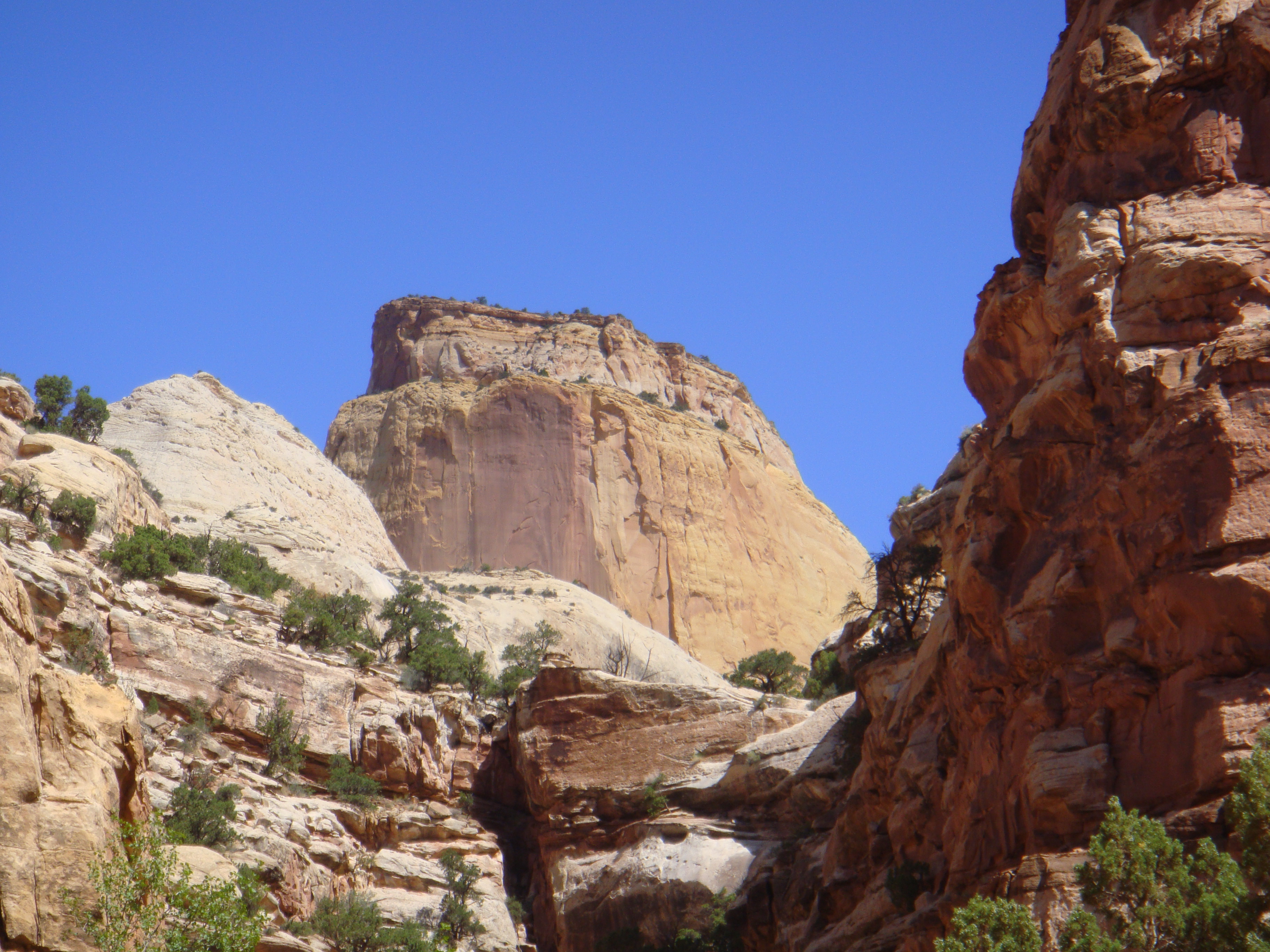
The Golden Throne, a rock formation in Capitol Reef National Park. Though the park is famous for white domes of the Navajo Sandstone, this dome's color is a result of a lingering section of yellow Carmel Formation carbonate, which has stained the underlying rock.

Frequent but short-lived changes in sea level during the Mid to Late Jurassic periodically flooded the area with shallow extensions of the ocean. The resulting San Rafael Group is composed of four formations that were deposited on top of the Glen Canyon Group's regionally traceable erosion surface. San Rafael Group formations are (from oldest to youngest);

- Page Sandstone,
- Carmel Formation,
- Entrada Sandstone,
- Curtis Formation, and
- Summerville Formation.

San Rafael formations can be seen on the east-dipping part of the Waterpocket Fold.

Climatic conditions were still arid when the locally 0 to 100 feet (0 to 30 m) thick Page Sandstone was deposited above the reach of high tide yet near the shore of an advancing sea (sabkha-like conditions). This formation is composed of three members; the

- Harris Wash,
- Judd Hollow, and the
- Thousand Pockets.

Together they were laid on top of the Navajo sand dunes as the sea slowly flooded the vast desert. An outcrop of the Judd Hollow Member can be seen from mile marker 86.5 as a red cliff above the Fremont River falls. The cross-bedded sandstone just above the red cliff is an example of the Thousand Pockets Member.

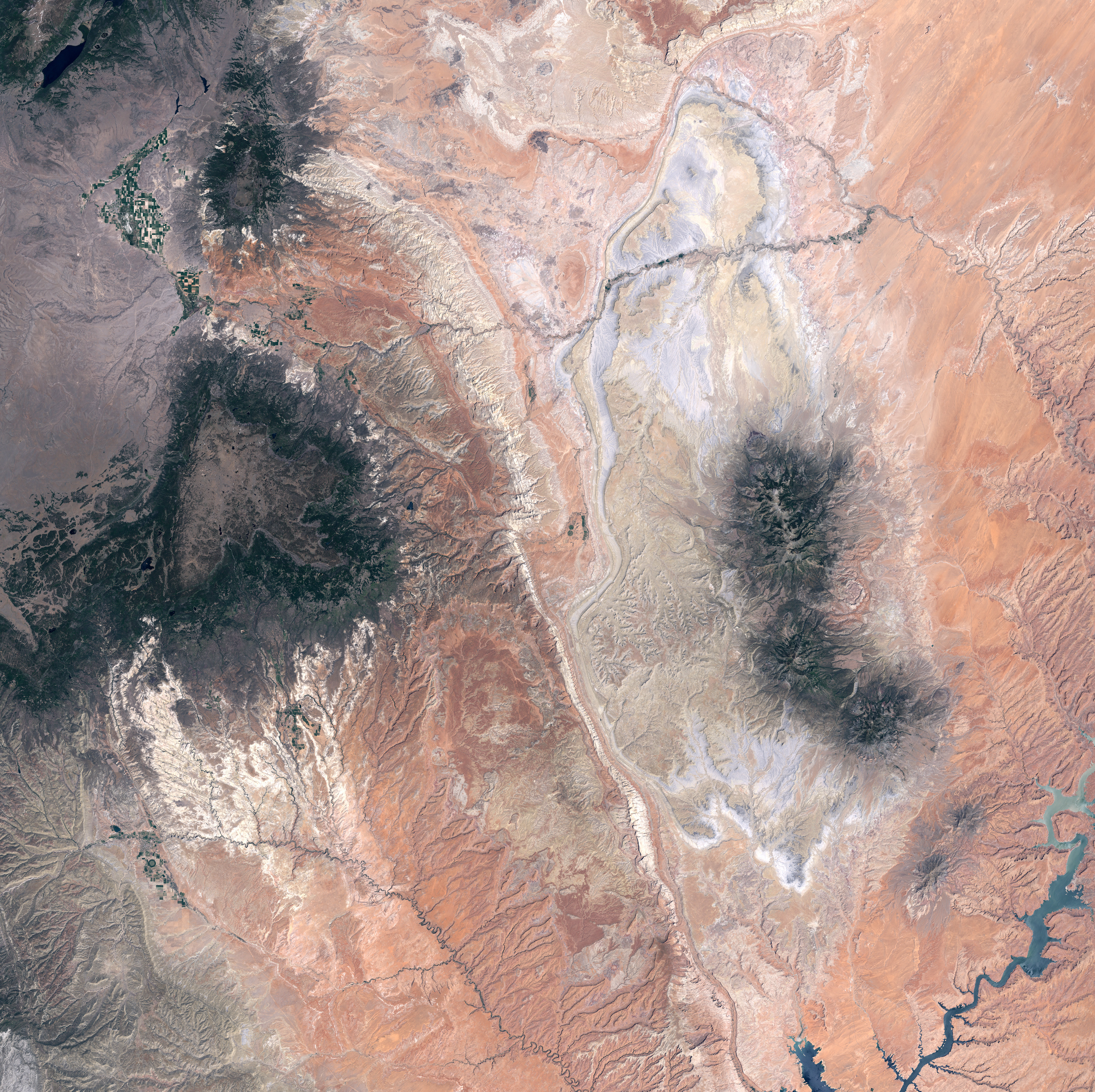
The Fremont River crosses the Waterpocket Fold in the upper half of this satellite picture, while the white line of Capitol Reef bisects the lower half.

In Mid Jurassic time gypsum, sand, and limey silt were deposited in what may have been a graben that was periodically covered by sea water and thus a place where repeated flooding was followed by evaporation. The resulting Carmel Formation is composed of 200 to 1,000 feet (60 to 300 m) of reddish-brown siltstone, mudstone and sandstone that alternates with whitish-gray gypsum and fossil-rich limestone in a banded pattern. Fossils include marine bivalves and ammonites. Most of the Carmel has been removed from the Waterpocket Fold's crest but outcrops can be seen capping the Golden Throne and atop various domes in the area. It can also be seen as reddish-brown triangular-shaped spurs called 'flatirons' that form the Waterpocket Fold's eastern rampart.

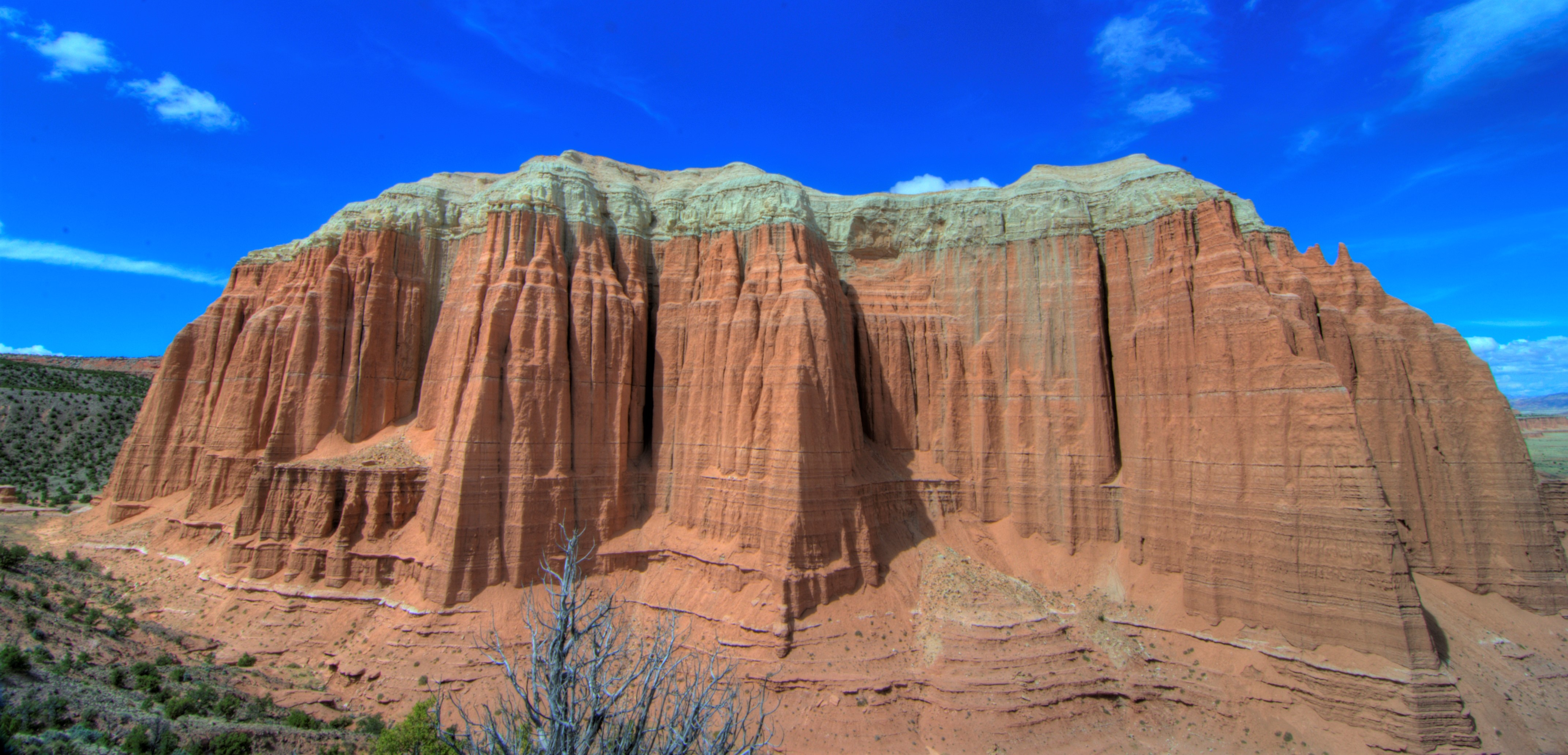
Cathedral Mountain in Cathedral Valley is composed of Entrada Sandstone capped by Curtis Formation

A near-shore environment dominated by barrier islands, sand bars and tidal flats later returned to the region. The sand and silt deposited created the 400 to 900 foot (120 to 275 m) thick reddish orange Entrada Sandstone. Distinctive jointing systems in the Entrada lead to the formation of cathedrals and monoliths in Capitol Reef's Cathedral Valley, arches in Arches National Park and 'goblins' (the local name for hoodoos) in nearby Goblin Valley State Park. Entrada exposures in the southern part of the park are mostly made of flat-bedded siltstones and erode into slopes. Moving north, Entrada exposures increasingly become rich in cross-bedded sandstone and erode into cliffs with fewer and fewer slopes.

Fine-grained sand and silt mixed with sandy lime were laid down as sediments on top of the Entrada Sandstone, forming the locally 0 to 175 foot (53 m) thick erosion-resistant Curtis Formation. A green iron potassium silicate called glauconite in the Curtis indicates it was deposited in a shallow sea. Outcrops of the light grayish-green Curtis can be seen as a capstone in the northern section of the park while it is locally absent in the southern part.

Tidal flat conditions returned as the shallow sea that created the Curtis Formation retreated from land. Thin beds of reddish-brown mudstone alternating with less frequent beds of greenish-gray sandstone and limestone were deposited as sediments, forming the locally 50 to 250 foot (15 to 75 m) thick Summerville Formation. This formation erodes into ledgy cliffs and slopes and can be seen above Curtis caprock in Cathedral Valley. Fossilized mudcracks and ripple marks are found in the Curtis along with up to 28 foot (8.5 m) thick gypsum-rich beds.

=== Morrison Formation (Jurassic) ===
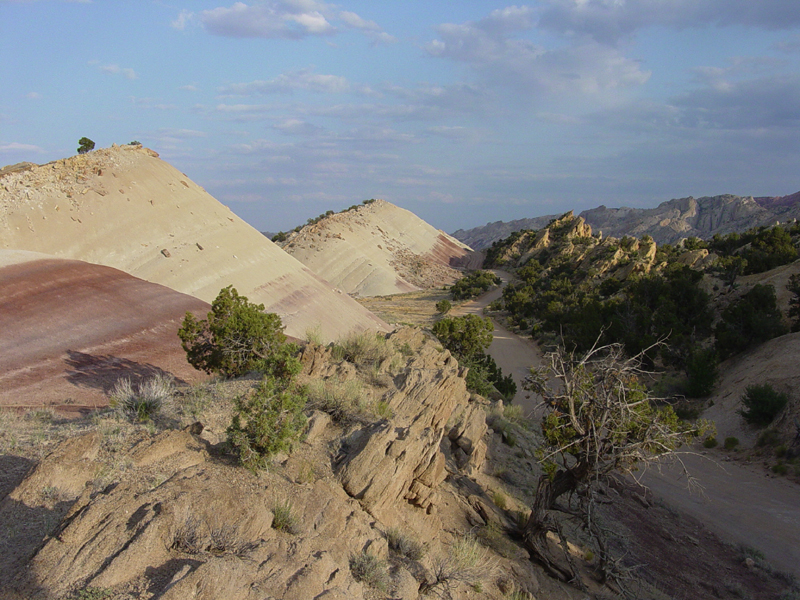
Morrison Formation from near Notom-Bullfrog Road (USGS)

Again above sea level, streams laid down mud and sand in their channels, on lakebeds, and in swampy plains during the Upper Jurassic. This became the Morrison Formation, which is locally divided into three members (from oldest to youngest);

- Tidwell Member,
- Salt Wash, and
- Brushy Basin.

The 50 to 100 foot (15 to 30 m) thick Tidwell Member is locally difficult to recognize and therefore may or may not be in the area's rocks. Easier to identify and study outcrops elsewhere in southeastern Utah indicate they were deposited in hypersaline lagoons.

Clay, mud, silt, cross-bedded sand, and pebbles were later deposited by meandering streams and in flood plains, forming the locally 100 to 500 foot (30 to 150 m) thick Salt Wash Member. Claystone and mudstone beds of this member erode into gray slopes that can exhibit brown, red, yellow, and green colors. Salt Wash sandstone is moderately sorted and fine to medium grained while pebble conglomerate beds are made of chert with small amounts of silica-rich limestone. Both bed types erode into ledges and small cliffs. The Salt Wash was locally mined in the 1950s to extract uranium ore.

The 200 to 350 foot (60 to 105 m) thick Brushy Basin Member is composed of claystone, mudstone, and siltstone with small amounts of conglomerate and sandstone. Clays in this member are rich in smectite and thus tend to swell when wet and dry to a crumbled surface that looks a bit like popcorn. Fossilized dinosaur bones are abundant in this member in several places located in Utah and western Colorado. The bones are usually scattered and are thus hard to identify but nearly complete skeletons have been found in lake floor and flood-plain clays. Good exposures of the Brushy Basin Member can be seen in the Bentonite Hills.

=== Cedar Mountain and Dakota formations (Cretaceous) ===
The Capitol Reef area was on the edge of an epicontinental sea for much of the Cretaceous (USGS).

Early Cretaceous time brought continental deposition that was dominated by rivers to the area. Sandstones and mudstones accumulated to form the 0 to 166 foot (50.5 m) thick slope-forming Cedar Mountain Formation. The 73 foot (22 m) thick Buckhorn Conglomerate Member thins out north and east of the park and is nearly absent in it, making it difficult to distinguish the underlying Morrison from the somewhat more pastel-colored Cedar Mountain. Fossilized freshwater animals such as mollusks and ostracods along with dinosaurs, fish scales, pollen and a genus of fern called Tempskya have been found in this formation.

The passive continental margin became active when the Farallon Plate started to dive below the North American Plate. Geologists call the resulting mountain-building event the Sevier orogeny. Compressive forces detached sedimentary units across western Utah and Nevada from their Precambrian basement rocks and pushed them eastward. The weight of the resulting high mountain range that formed to the west, lowered much of Utah and allowed the sea to invade. This grew into a vast sea that periodically divided North America in the Cretaceous called the Western Interior Seaway.

Non-marine sediments of the approximately 100- to 94-million-year-old Dakota Sandstone were deposited on the shore of this seaway early in the Cretaceous. The up to 150 foot (45 m) thick formation consists of fine-grained tan to brownish-gray colored quartz-rich sandstone that is interbedded with thin layers of carbon-rich shale, coal, and conglomerate.

Petrified wood is found in the lower part of the formation while fossilized marine bivalves such as Corbula and Pycnodonte newberryi are in the upper layers. This fossil progression shows a record of flooding that created the seaway. Dakota erode into small cliffs and hogbacks that can be seen in the southern section of the park.

=== Mancos Shale and Mesaverde Formation (Cretaceous) ===
Approximately 94 to 85 million years ago, the seaway advanced onto and retreated from land as it laid down the Mancos Shale. The Mancos is composed mostly of shale but two of its members, the Ferron and Muley Canyon, are sandstone that were laid down when relative sea level temporarily dropped. The five Mancos members from oldest to youngest are:

1. Tununk Shale,
2. Ferron Sandstone,
3. Blue Gate Shale,
4. Muley Canyon, and
5. Masuk.

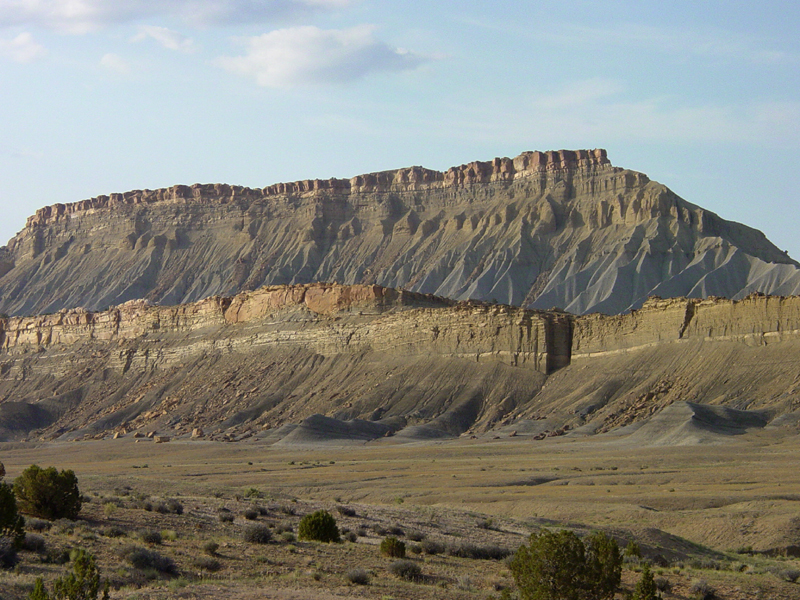
Mancos Shale slopes along the east side of Strike Valley (USGS)

Parts of this formation are found in some mesas and buttes in the southernmost part of the park and in badlands east of the park.

Open marine conditions created the locally 40 to 720 feet (12 to 220 m) thick gullied slope-forming Tununk Shale Member. It is made of bluish-gray shale with interbedded mudstone, fine-grained sandstone and siltstone. The Tununk erodes into a slope and is locally fossil-rich. It is most prominently exposed in the Blue Desert immediately southeast of Cathedral Valley and contains fossilized examples of cephalopods, bivalves, and fish scales.

A wave-dominated delta and river system then spread over the area, creating the locally 205 to 385 feet (62 to 117 m) thick cliff-forming Ferron Sandstone. It is composed of brown fine-grained sandstone along with white cross-bedded sandstone with interbedded carbonate-rich gray shale. The marine bivalve Inoceramus and trace fossils of Ophiomorpha are found in the lower part of this member. Ferron Sandstone north of the area contains seams of coal in its upper part, prompting some petroleum geologists to study this member to model oil-bearing regions.

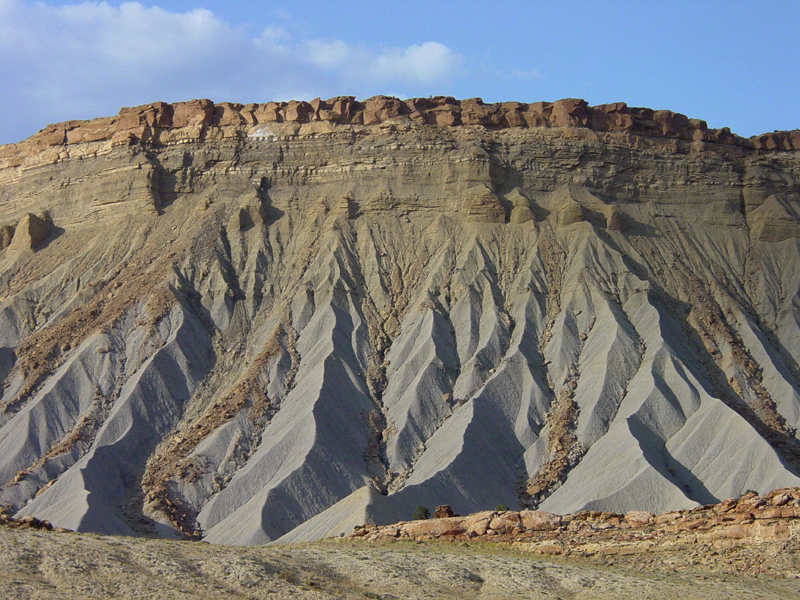
Mancos Shale badlands

Open marine conditions returned in the Late Cretaceous, forming the locally 1,200 to 1,500 foot (365 to 460 m) thick slope-forming Blue Gate Shale. This member is composed of bentonite rich clays, siltstone and some sandstone. It erodes into gullied slopes similar in appearance to the Tununk Shale. The presence of two species of planktonic foraminifera in the upper Blue Gate, Clioscaphites vermiformis and Clioscaphites choteauenis, was used to date this member.

An ancient shoreline once again approached the area, resulting in the formation of the locally 300 to 400 feet (90 to 120 m) thick Muley Canyon Member. It is composed of evenly bedded, fine-grained sandstone and carbon-rich shales. Coal beds are found in the upper parts of this member, indicating continental coastal plain conditions at that time.

Alternating layers of shallow marine and non-marine sediments were deposited as the shoreline fluctuated back and forth over the area. These sediments became the locally 650 to 750 foot (200 to 230 m) thick Masuk Member. The Masuk consists of cliff-forming cross-bedded sandstones and slope-forming yellowish-gray to bluish-gray mudstones with interbedded light gray sandstones. Fossils of bivalves, ceratopsian dinosaurs, crocodiles, gastropods, and turtles have been collected in this member.

The Western Interior Seaway was shrinking due to infilling and uplift while the high mountains to the east were being reduced by erosion. Barrier beaches and river deltas migrated eastward into the seaway. The resulting 300 to 400 foot (90 to 120 m) thick Mesaverde Formation consists of light-brown to dark-gray thick-bedded and cross-stratified sandstone with interbedded dark gray shale and intertongues with the Masuk Member of the overlying Mancos Shale. Only small remnants are found capping a few mesas in the park's eastern section.

== Uplift and Cenozoic events ==
=== Waterpocket Fold, Lake Uinta and volcanism ===
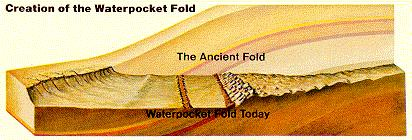
Waterpocket Fold cross section showing eroded part (NPS) Photo of the fold looking south from the Strike Valley Overlook (USGS)

The Laramide orogeny compacted the region from about 70 million to 50 million years ago and in the process created the Rocky Mountains. Many monoclines (a type of gentle upward fold in rock strata) were also formed by the deep compressive forces of the Laramide. One of those monoclines, called the Waterpocket Fold, is the major geographic feature of the park. The 100 mile (160 km) long fold has a north–south alignment with a steeply east-dipping side. The rock layers on the west side of the Waterpocket Fold have been lifted more than 7,000 feet (2,100 m) higher than the layers on the east. Thus older rocks are exposed on the western part of the fold and younger rocks on the eastern part. This particular fold may have been created due to movement along a fault in the Precambrian basement rocks hidden well below any exposed formations. Small earthquakes centered below the fold in 1979 may be from such a fault.

Contemporary with the Waterpocket Fold's formation was the development of an intermontane (between mountains) basin in the area. Lake Uinta filled this basin with stream water derived from the north and south. This large lake existed from about 58 million until 35 million years ago and is responsible for creating the Flagstaff Limestone and Green River Formation, which locally reach a thickness of around 200 feet (60 m). Elsewhere these formations have a combined thickness of over 9,000 feet (2,740 m). The Flagstaff is a white-colored, fossil rich layer that is composed of limestone, tufa and conglomerate that erodes into ledges and slopes.

Compressive forces caused by the Laramide orogeny were followed by some minor stretching as a new equilibrium was established. This created weaknesses in the crust that allowed magma to intrude toward the surface to create composite volcanos west of the area some 25 to 20 million years ago. Within the fold, magma intruded through and between formations about 4.6 to 3.7 million years ago to respectively create dikes and sills. Small basaltic lava flows erupted through fissures at the surface and igneous activity continued sporadically afterwards. Subsequent erosion preferentially removed the softer sedimentary rock that initially entombed the dikes, sills, and volcanic plugs, often leaving them standing in relief. Examples can be seen in South Desert and Cathedral Valley at the northern end of the fold.

=== Erosion ===
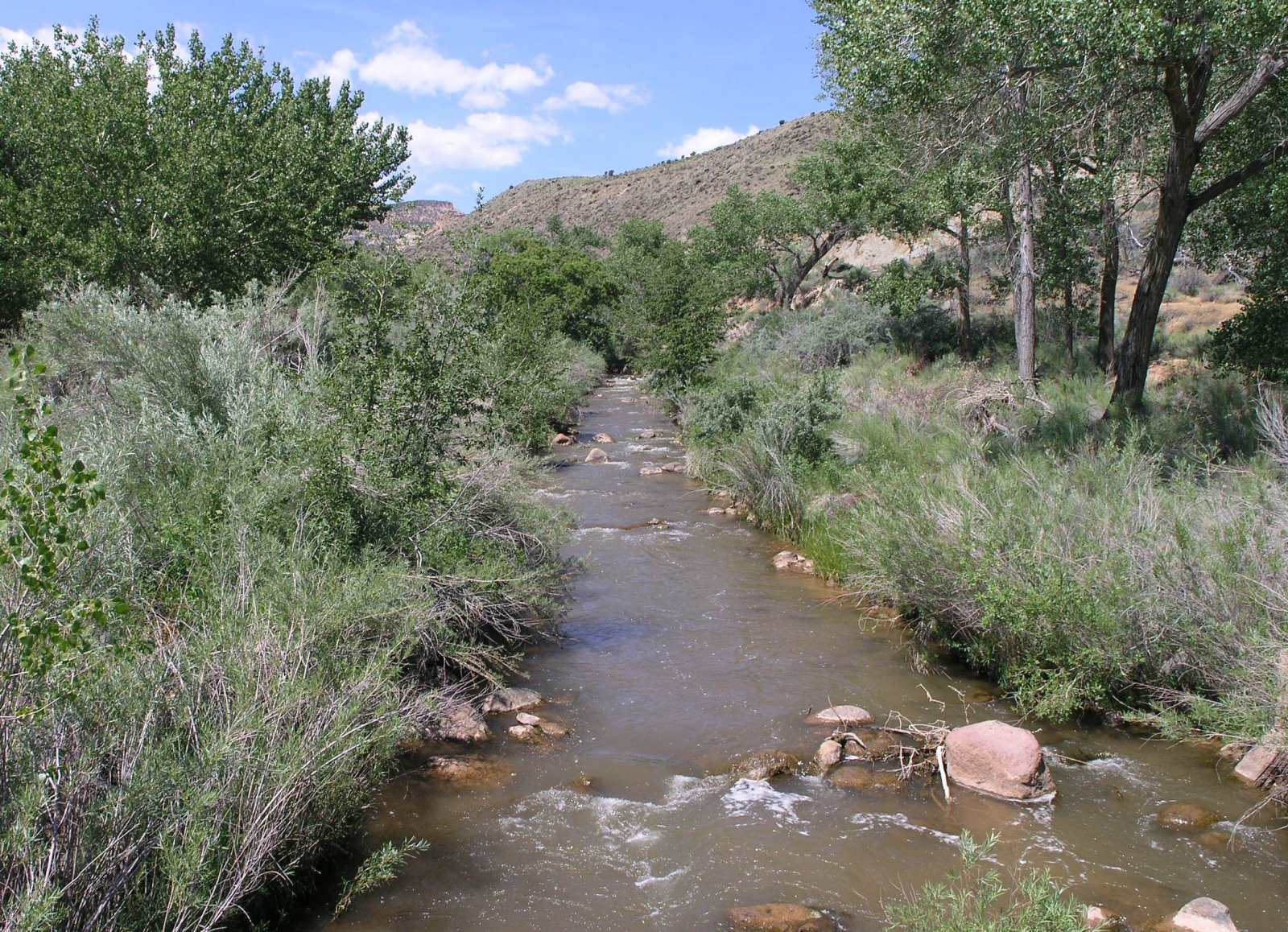
The Fremont River has been able to keep up with the uplift of the Waterpocket Fold.

Ten to fifteen million years ago the entire region was uplifted several thousand feet (well over a kilometer) by the creation of the Colorado Plateaus. This time the uplift was more even, leaving the overall orientation of the formations mostly intact. Most of the erosion that carved today's landscape occurred after the uplifting of the Colorado Plateau with much of the major canyon cutting probably occurring between 1 and 6 million years ago. Even in this desert climate, water is the erosional agent most responsible for the carving of the landscape. The pull of gravity, in the form of rock falls or rock creep, plays a major role in the shaping of the cliff lines. Wind is a minor agent of erosion here.

The drainage system in the area was rearranged and steepened as the Waterpocket Fold was uplifted. Larger streams, such as the Fremont River, were more likely to keep up with the uplift by downcutting into the Waterpocket Fold faster. Other streams, such as Sand Creek, changed their course by flowing parallel to the fold and cutting into less resistant formations. Yet other streams tried to keep up with the uplift by carving slot canyons only to later change course, leaving their canyons literally high and dry. A total of 7,000 feet (2,100 m) of overlying Mesozoic and Cenozoic sediment has been removed by erosion in the area.

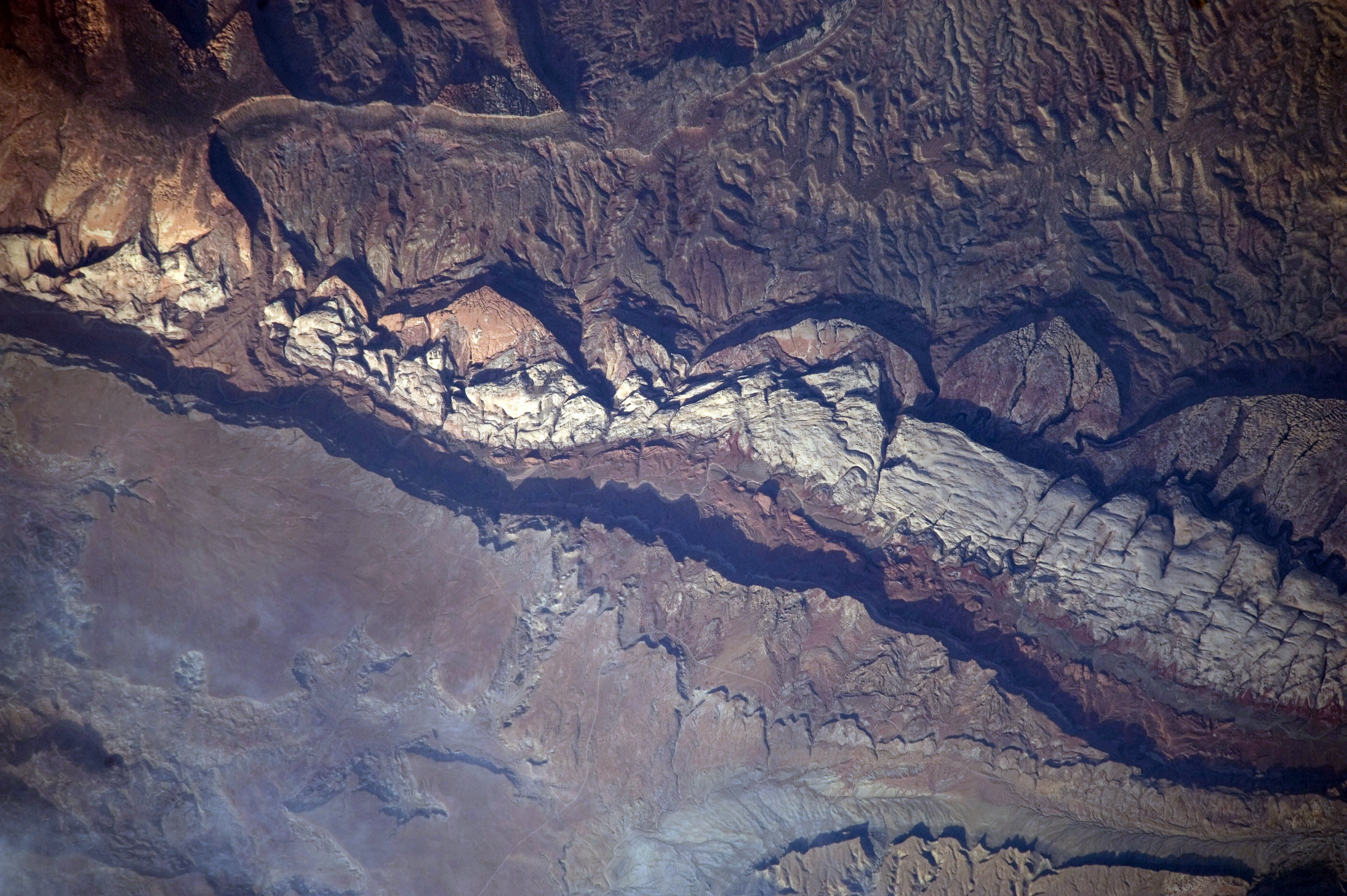
Big Thomson Mesa seen from space

Wetter and cooler conditions developed during the Pleistocene epoch and briefly returned via at least two neoglacial episodes (little ice ages) in the current epoch, the Holocene. The various rivers and streams in the area were engorged by increased precipitation and with melt-water from mountain glaciers on the Henry Mountains to the east and the Aquarius Plateau to the west of the park. Flash floods, mass wasting of hillsides, frost wedging, and landslides all contributed to a significantly faster rate of erosion. Glaciers plucked 20- to 30-million-year-old black basaltic boulders from atop Boulder and Thousand Lake Mountains that were subsequently deposited over the park area by meltwater streams from the glaciers, rockslides and floods.
