= Golden Throne (mountain) =

Mountain and rock formation in Utah, USA

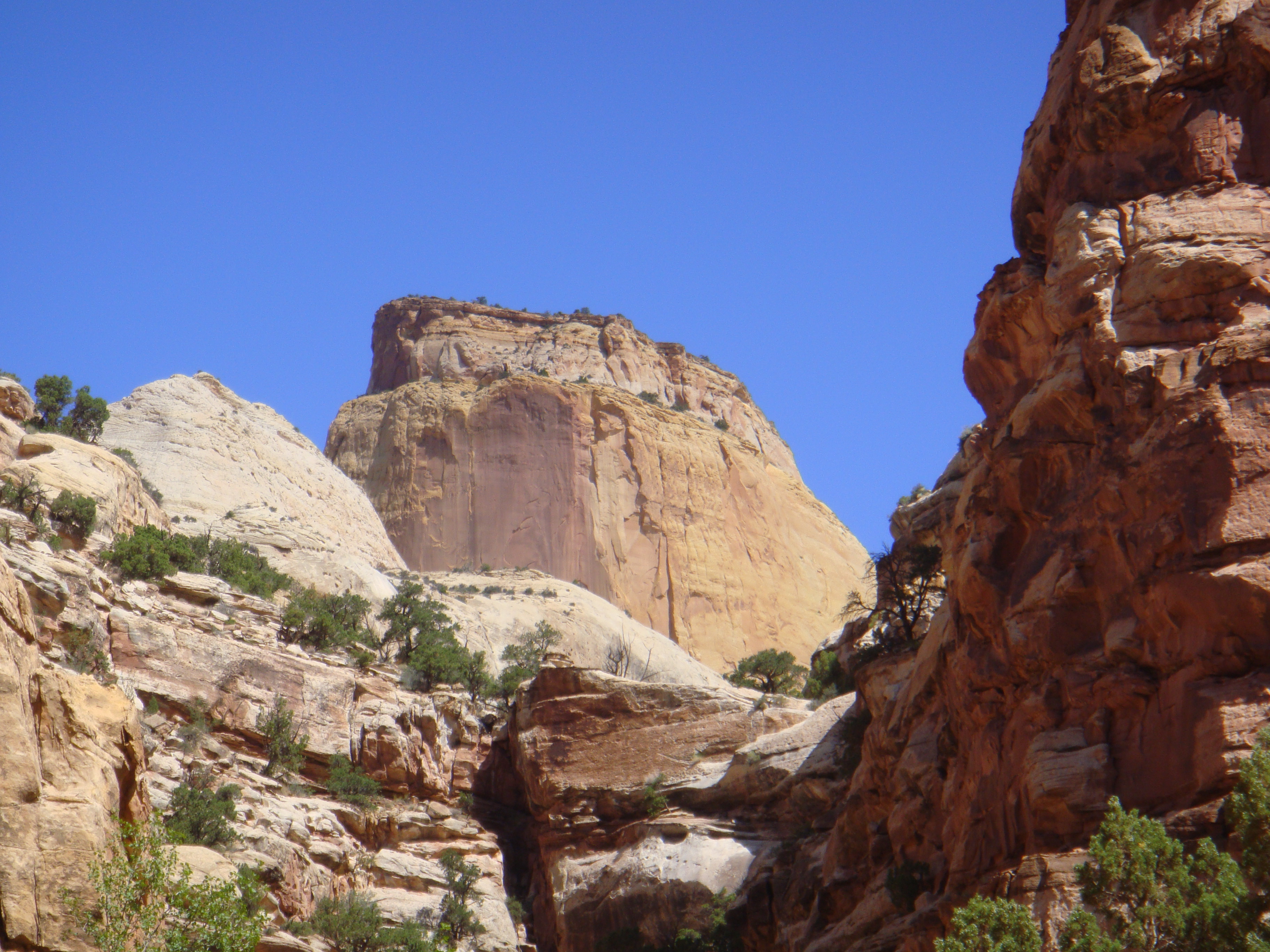
- The Golden Throne from Capitol Gorge

Highest point
- Elevation: 7,042 ft (2,146 m) NGVD 29
- Prominence: 462 ft (141 m)
- Coordinates: 38°13′06″N 111°11′03″W

Geography
- Location within Utah
- Location: Wayne County, Utah U.S.
- Topo map: USGS Golden Throne

Climbing
- Easiest route: Strenuous hike

The Golden Throne is a 7,041-foot (2,146 m) mountain in Capitol Reef National Park in Wayne County, Utah, United States. It is a rock formation dome made of a gold color stained Navajo Sandstone, which is particularly special because normally the sandstone is creamy white or red. The presence of a small amount of the Carmel Formation on top of the Navajo Sandstone is the reason for this staining.

A two-mile-long (3.2 km) trail runs below the mountain. The summit is 7,042 feet (2,146 m) in elevation and is part of the Waterpocket Fold, a nearly 100-mile-long (160 km) monocline.

== See also ==
- List of mountains in Utah
