= Waterpocket Fold =

Geologic feature in Utah, United States

Coordinates: 38°01′18″N 111°07′14″W

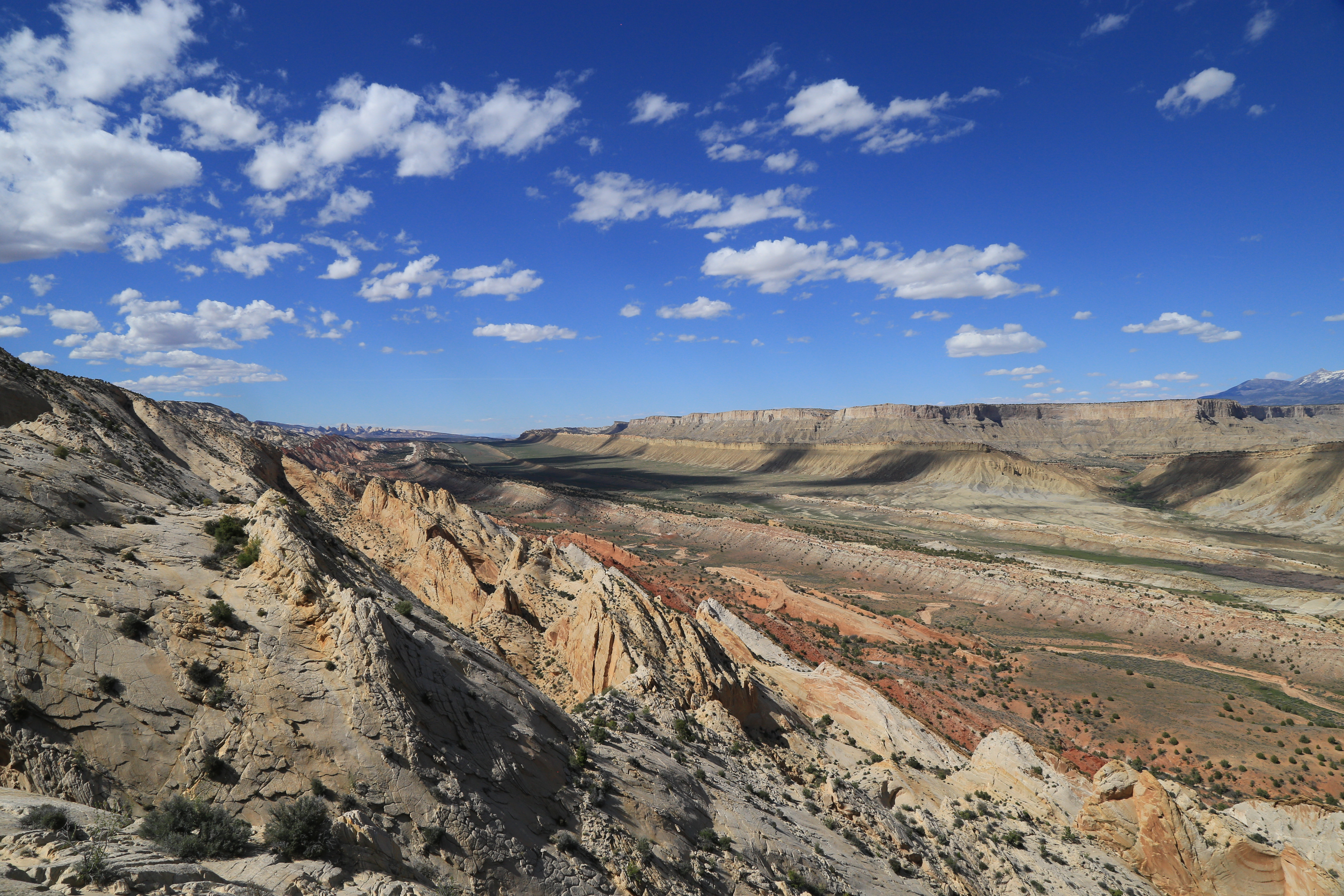
Northward view of the Strike Valley from the Strike Valley Overlook

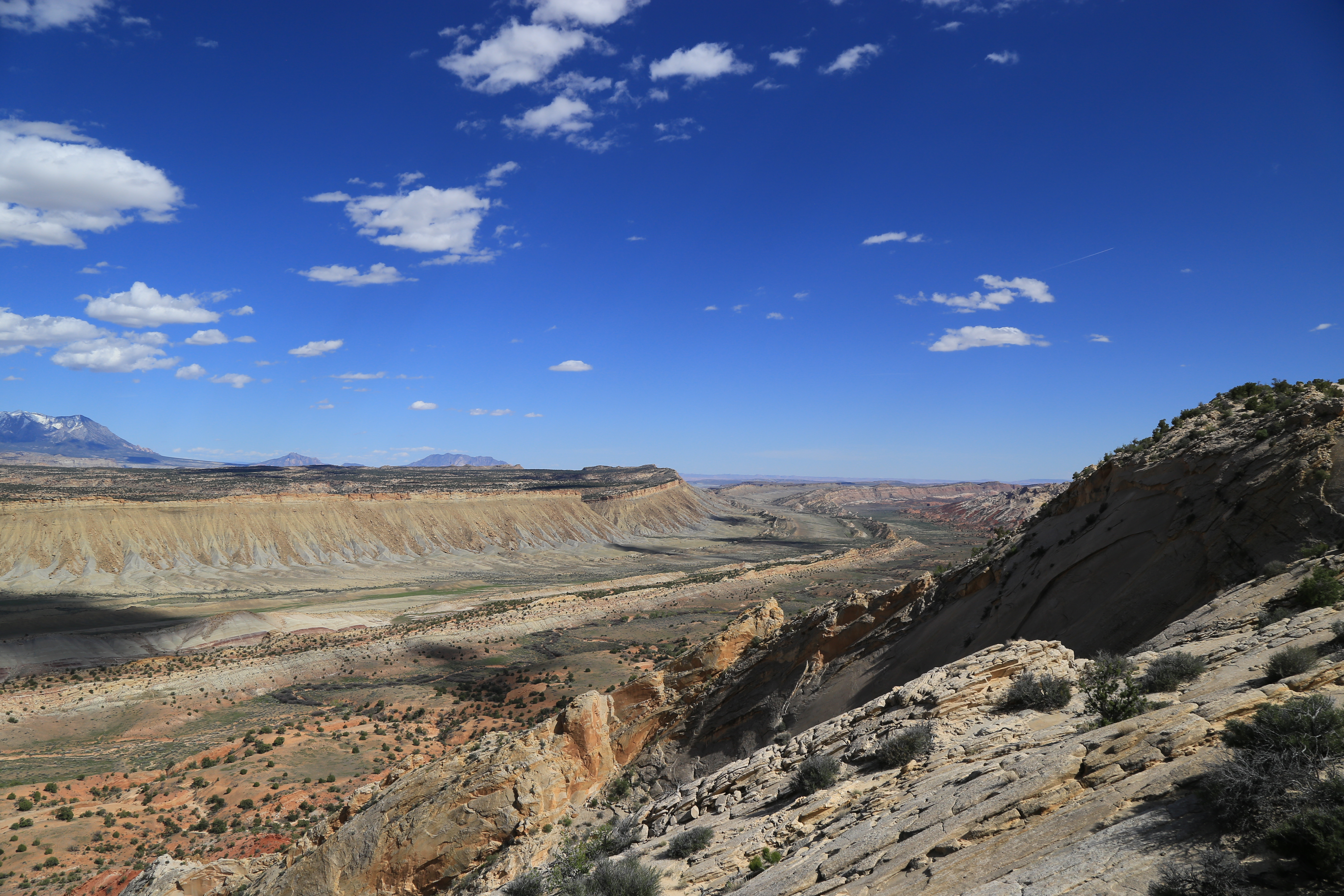
Southward view from the Strike Valley Overlook

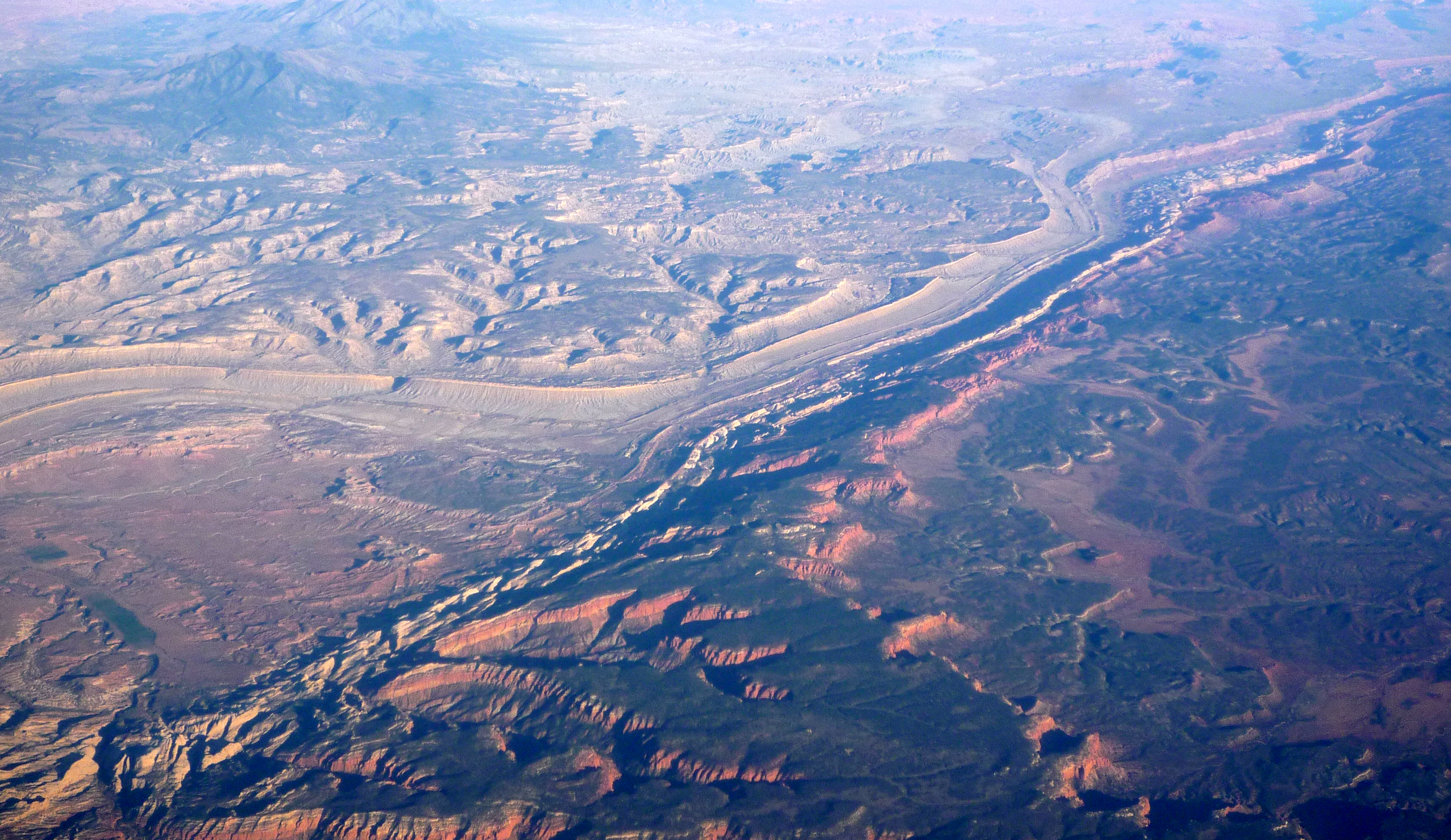
Aerial view of Waterpocket Fold

The Waterpocket Fold is a geologic landform that extends from southern Wayne through Garfield and ending in northern Kane counties of southern Utah, United States. The geologic structure, formed during the Laramide orogeny, is a south-southeast trending fold in which the east side is dropped relative to the west side. This monoclinal fold extends for nearly 100 miles (160 km) in the semi-arid plateau of the central part of the state. The structure defines the Capitol Reef National Park in southern Utah.

The feature can be observed in three scenic routes in the park. The park's Scenic Drive leads to a famous landmark known as the Golden Throne. The northern portion of the Waterpocket Fold lies north and east of the town of Fruita, three miles (4.8 km) west and just southeast of the Middle Desert. Utah State Route 24 crosses the fold east of Fruita. Notom Road runs south through Notom and runs parallel to the east (downdropped) side of the structure to its intersection with Utah State Route 276 just north of Lake Powell. The southern end of the structure extends to the Colorado River just southwest of Halls Crossing.

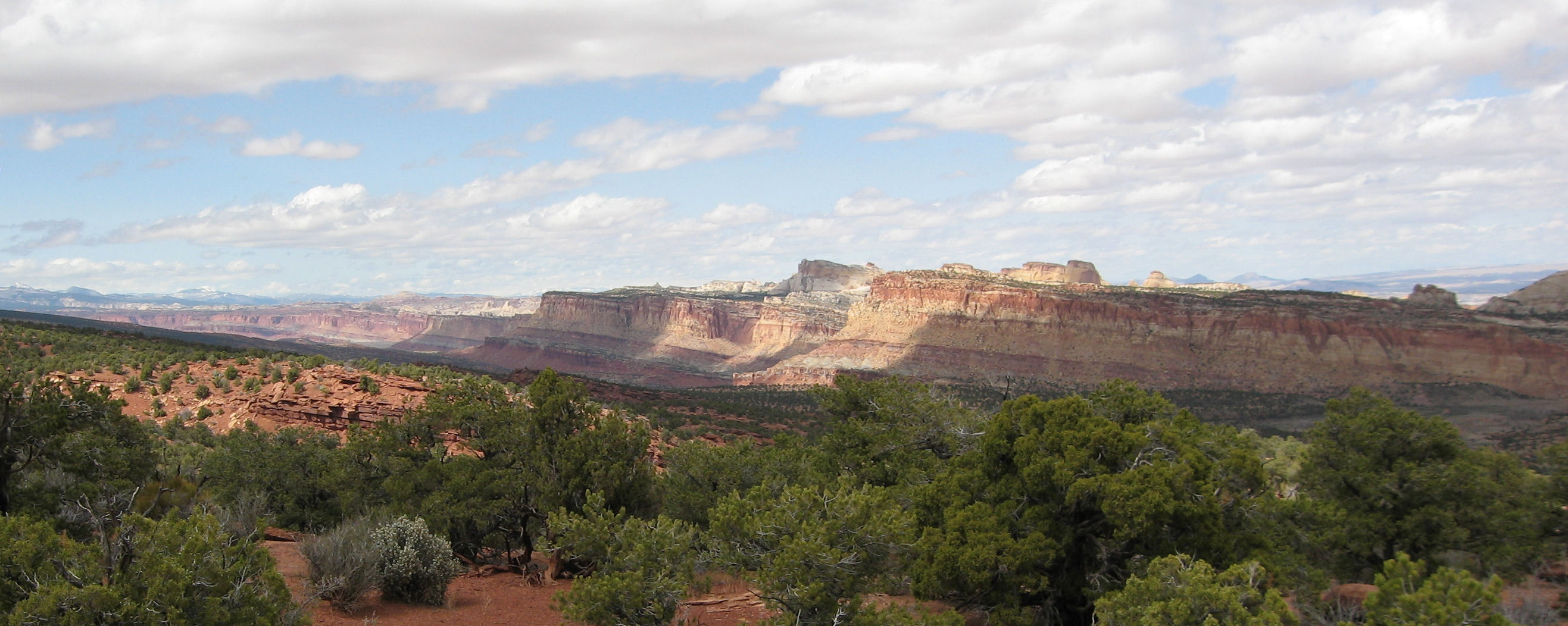
West face of Waterpocket fold – Looking north from Miners Mountain

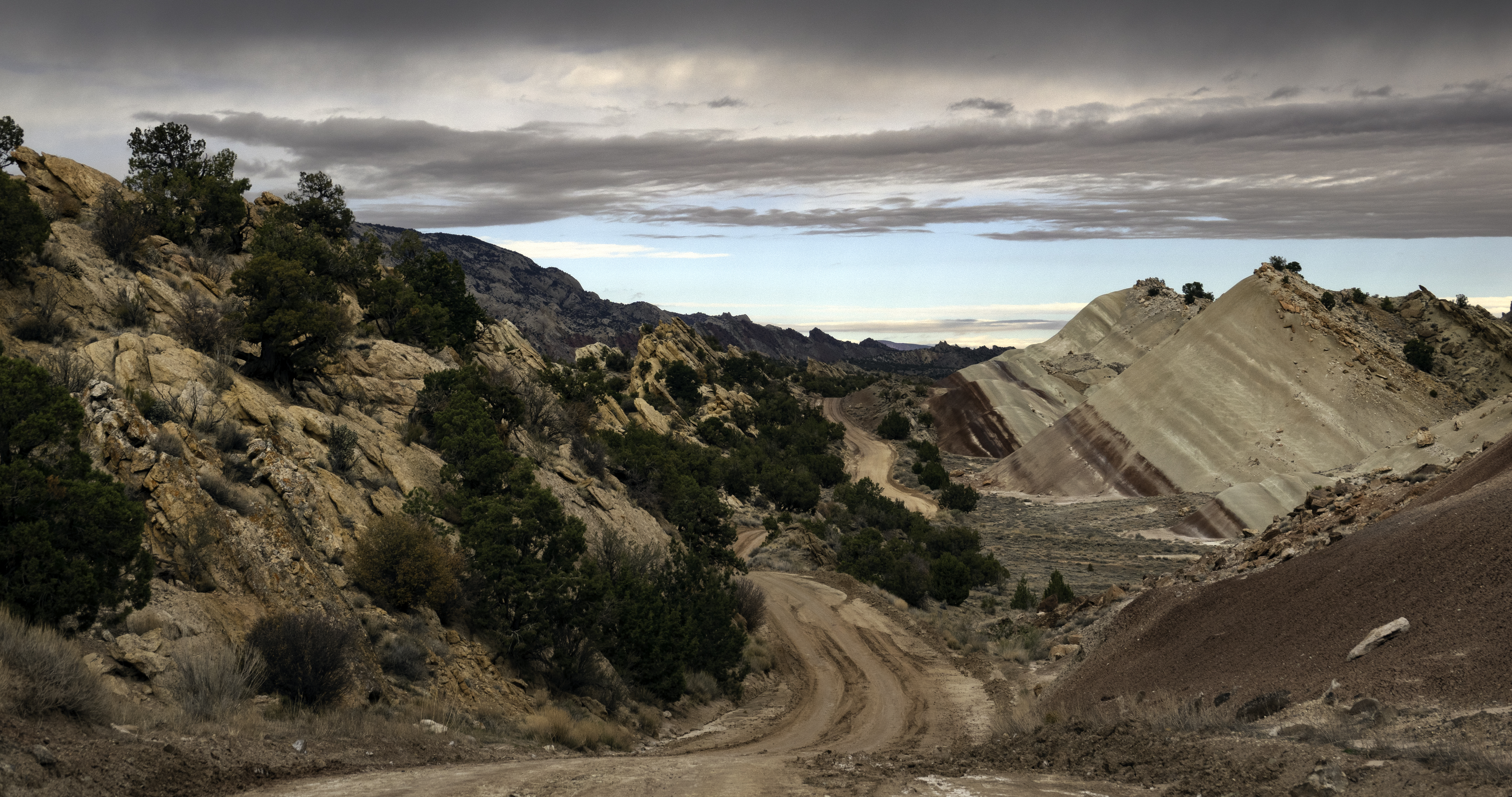
View of tilted Morrison Formation beds along Notom Road, Capitol Reef NP

== See also ==
- Geology of the Capitol Reef area
