= Monocline =

Geological structure

block diagram of a monocline

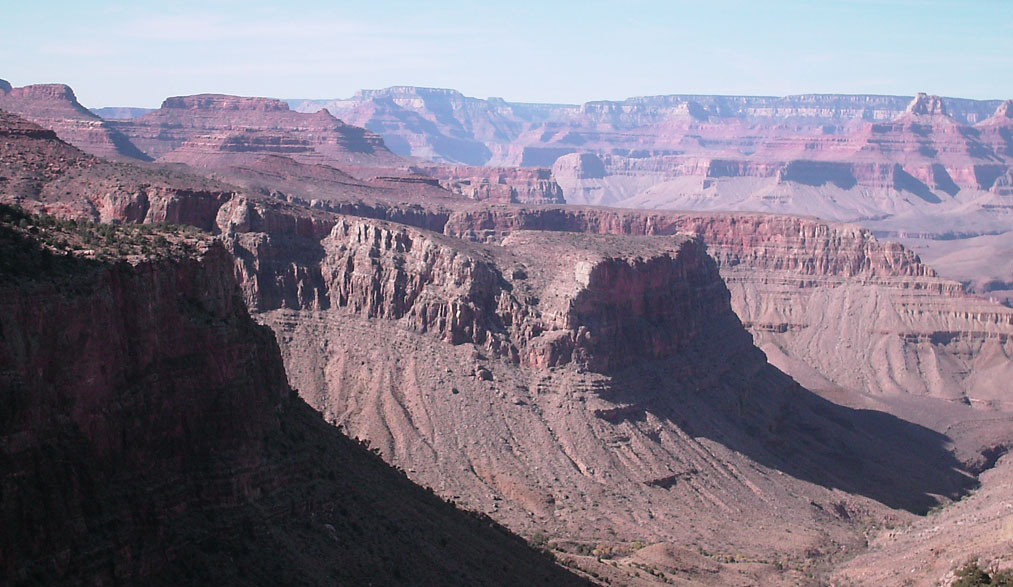
The Grandview-Phantom Monocline in the Grand Canyon, Arizona

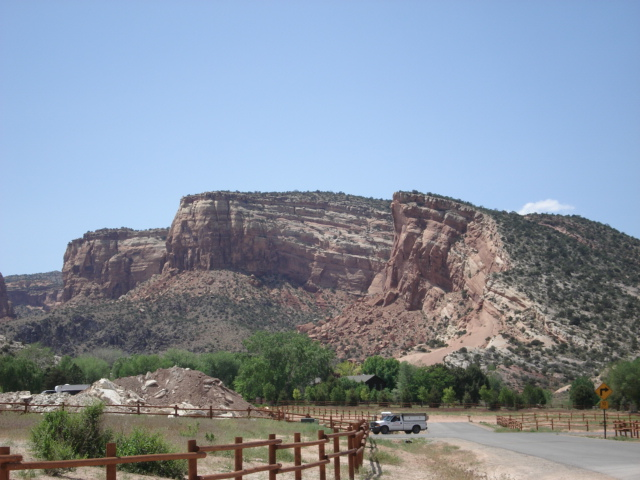
Monocline at Colorado National Monument

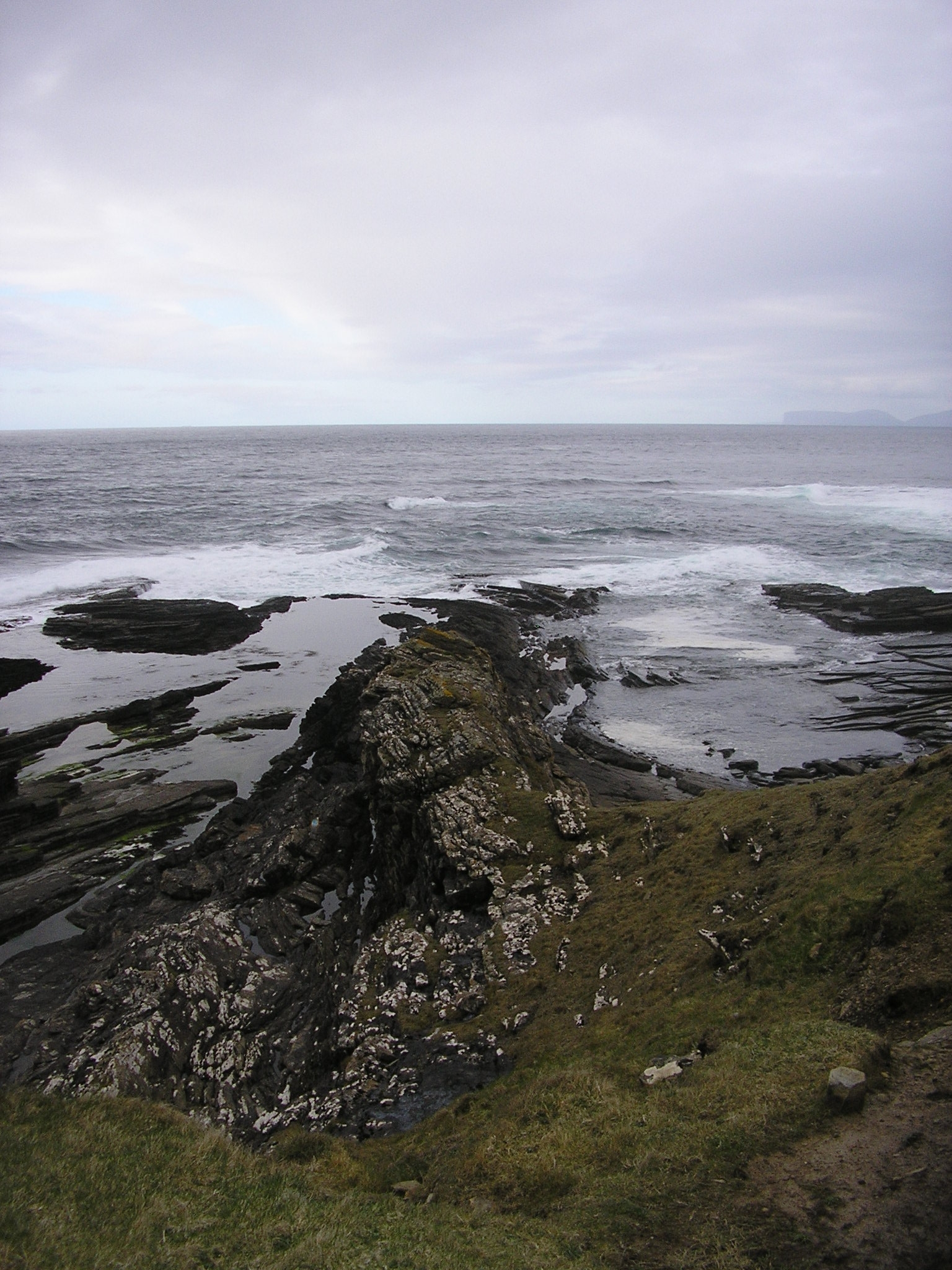
Monocline formed at tip of small thrust fault, Brims Ness, Caithness, Scotland

A monocline (or, rarely, a monoform) is a step-like fold in rock strata consisting of a zone of steeper dip within an otherwise horizontal or gently dipping sequence.

== Formation ==
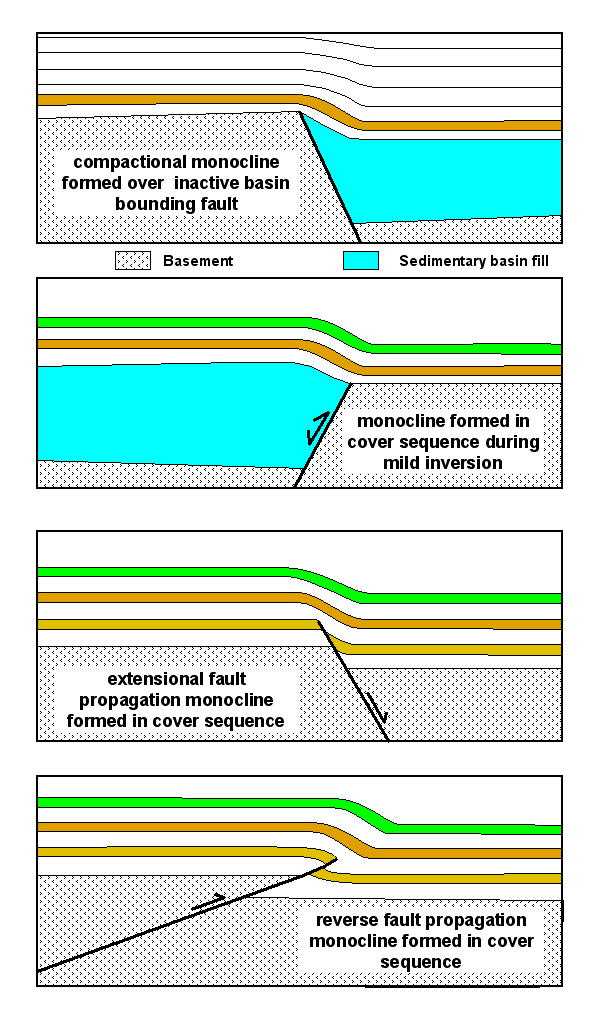
Possible modes of formation of monoclines

Monoclines may be formed in several different ways (see diagram)

- By differential compaction over an underlying structure, particularly a large fault at the edge of a basin due to the greater compactibility of the basin fill, the amplitude of the fold will die out gradually upwards.
- By mild reactivation of an earlier extensional fault during a phase of inversion causing folding in the overlying sequence.
- As a form of fault propagation fold during upward propagation of an extensional fault in basement into an overlying cover sequence.
- As a form of fault propagation fold during upward propagation of a reverse fault in basement into an overlying cover sequence.

== Examples ==
- Waterpocket Fold in Capitol Reef National Park, Utah
- Comb Ridge in southern Utah
- Grandview-Phantom Monocline in Grand Canyon, Arizona
- Grand Hogback in Colorado
- Lebombo Mountains in Southern Africa
- Lapstone Monocline in the Blue Mountains (Australia)
- Beaumaris Monocline in Victoria (Australia)
- Purbeck Monocline on the Isle of Purbeck, Dorset, England
- Fore-Sudetic Monocline, Poland
- Sindh Monocline, Pakistan
- Torres Flexure, southern Brazil

== See also ==
- Anticline
- Homocline
- Syncline
