= Fremont River =

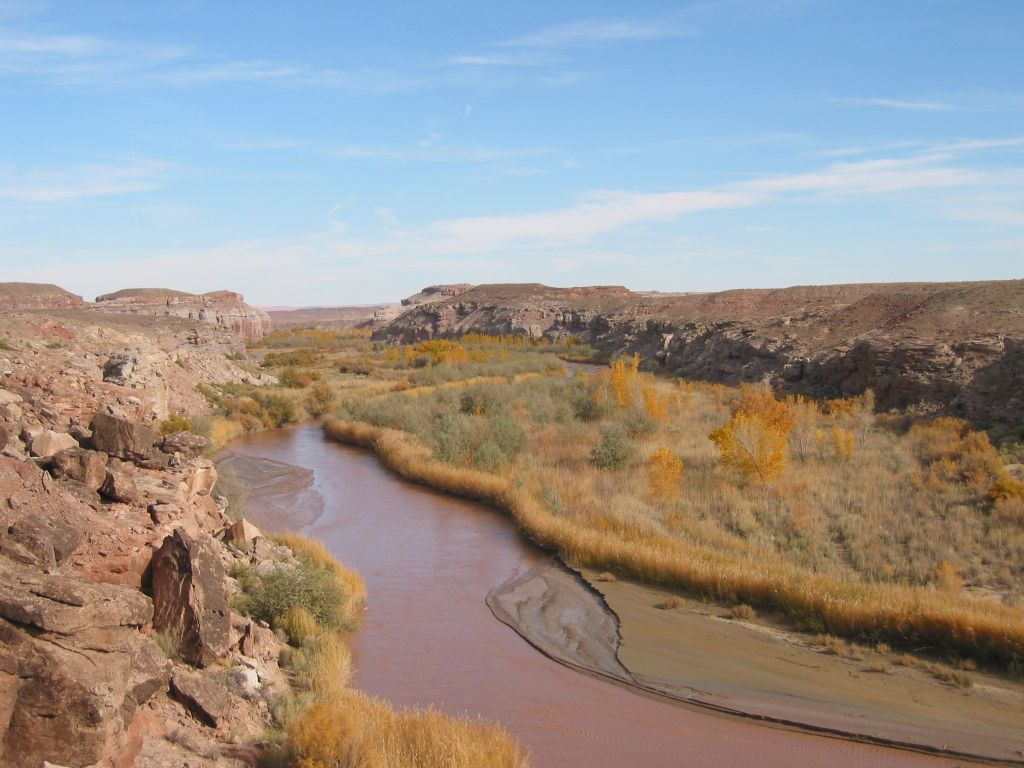
- Looking south along the Fremont River near Caineville, February 2005

- Location of the mouth of the Fremont River in Utah
- Etymology: John C. Frémont

Location
- Country: United States
- State: Utah
- Region: Sevier and Wayne counties

Physical characteristics
- Source
  - location: Johnson Valley Reservoir
  - coordinates: 38°36′32″N 111°37′56″W
  - elevation: 8,819 ft (2,688 m)
- Mouth: Dirty Devil River
  - location: near Hanksville
  - coordinates: 38°24′10″N 110°41′35″W
  - elevation: 4,250 ft (1,300 m)
- Length: 95 mi (153 km)
- Basin size: 751 sq mi (1,950 km^{2})
- Discharge
  - location: Bicknell
  - average: 83.9 cu ft/s (2.38 m^{3}/s)
  - minimum: 18 cu ft/s (0.51 m^{3}/s)
  - maximum: 1,360 cu ft/s (39 m^{3}/s)

The Fremont River is a 95-mile (153 km) long river in southeastern Utah, United States that flows from the Johnson Valley Reservoir, which is located on the Wasatch Plateau near Fish Lake, southeast through Capitol Reef National Park to the Muddy Creek near Hanksville where the two rivers combine to form the Dirty Devil River, a tributary of the Colorado River.

== Course ==
The Johnson Valley Reservoir is fed by Sevenmile Creek (from the north) and Lake Creek (from the southwest). The Fremont River passes through Fremont, Loa, Lyman, Bicknell, Teasdale, and Torrey and provides year-round irrigation for the agricultural lands of Rabbit Valley and Caineville. Then it heads through Hanksville and afterward to its mouth.

== Miscellaneous ==
The Fremont River has a drainage area of 751 square miles (1,950 km^{2}) fed by spring snowmelt off Thousand Lake Mountain, Boulder Mountain, and the northern Henry Mountains. The river is named after John Charles Frémont. It gives its name to the Fremont culture, a Precolumbian archaeological culture.

== Flow ==
Flow (ft^3/s), by month (1977–2003), at Bicknell gauging station:

Month	Mean	Min	Max
January	85.6	54.1	145.0
February	90.9	59.7	140.0
March	86.6	63.7	133.0
April	89.2	66.1	131.0
May	96.2	70.0	135.0
June	112.0	66.4	243.0
July	119.0	63.3	412.0
August	86.4	58.7	163.0
September	70.7	46.1	174.0
October	67.5	50.7	135.0
November	74.2	46.3	139.0
December	77.0	51.4	119.0

== See also ==
- List of Utah rivers
- List of tributaries of the Colorado River
