= Thousand Lake Mountain =

Mountain in the American state of Utah

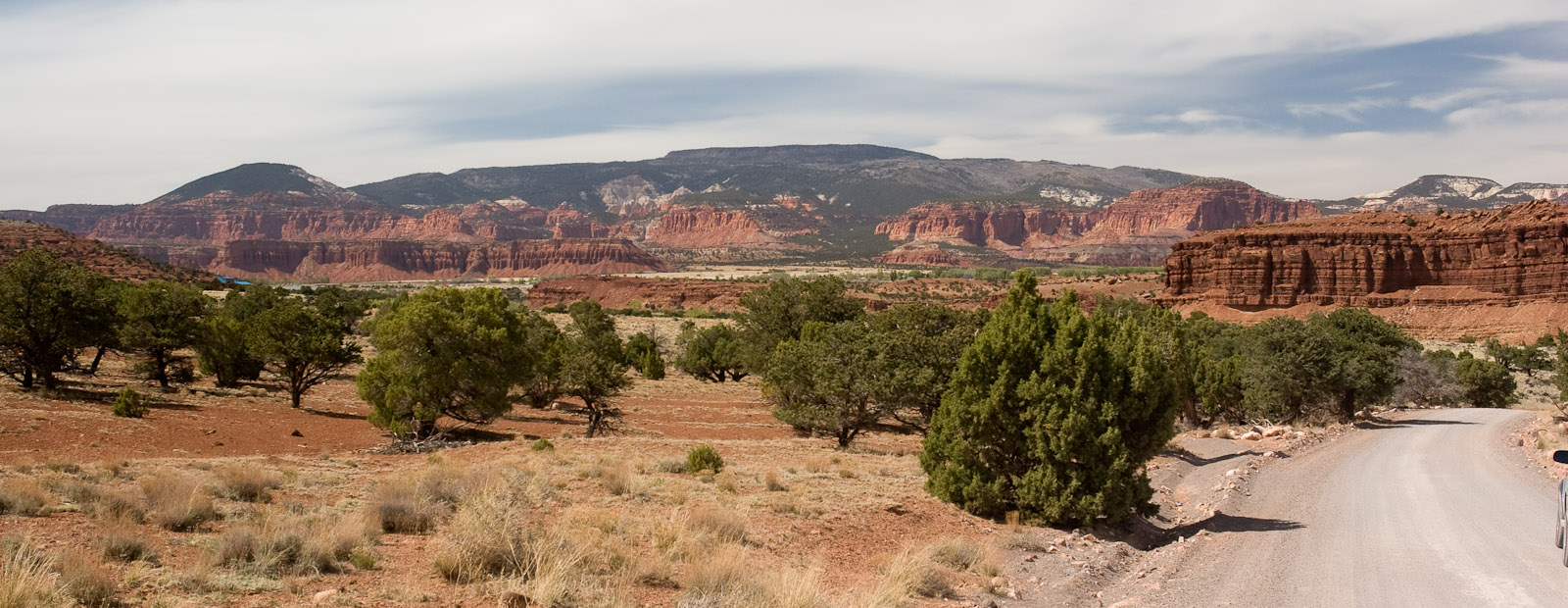
- Thousand Lake Mountain from south of Torrey, May 2006

Highest point
- Elevation: 11,300 ft (3,444.2 m) NAVD 88
- Prominence: 2,346 ft (715 m)
- Coordinates: 38°25′01″N 111°28′45″W

Geography
- Location within Utah
- Location: Wayne County, Utah; United States
- Parent range: Aquarius Plateau
- Topo map: USGS Flat Top

Climbing
- Easiest route: Hike

Thousand Lake Mountain is a mountain in northwest Wayne County, Utah, United States, just northwest of Capitol Reef National Park and north of Boulder Mountain.

== Description ==
Thousand Lake Mountain is surrounded by several small towns (Loa, Lyman, Fremont, Bicknell, Teasdale, and Torrey). The areas on and around Thousand Lake Mountain are used for farming, camping, hiking, horseback riding, hunting, and fishing. Thousand Lake Mountain is located in the easternmost section of Fishlake National Forest. A section of the Great Western Trail traverses the mountain from north to south. Thousand Lake Mountain is covered in boulders while Boulder Mountain has many lakes. There are several stories supposing to explain the mismatched names, most feasibly a cartographer writing the names he had been given on the wrong hills and not catching the mistake before maps were published.

== See also ==
- List of mountains in Utah
