= Capitol Reef National Park =

National park in Utah, United States

- IUCN category II (national park)
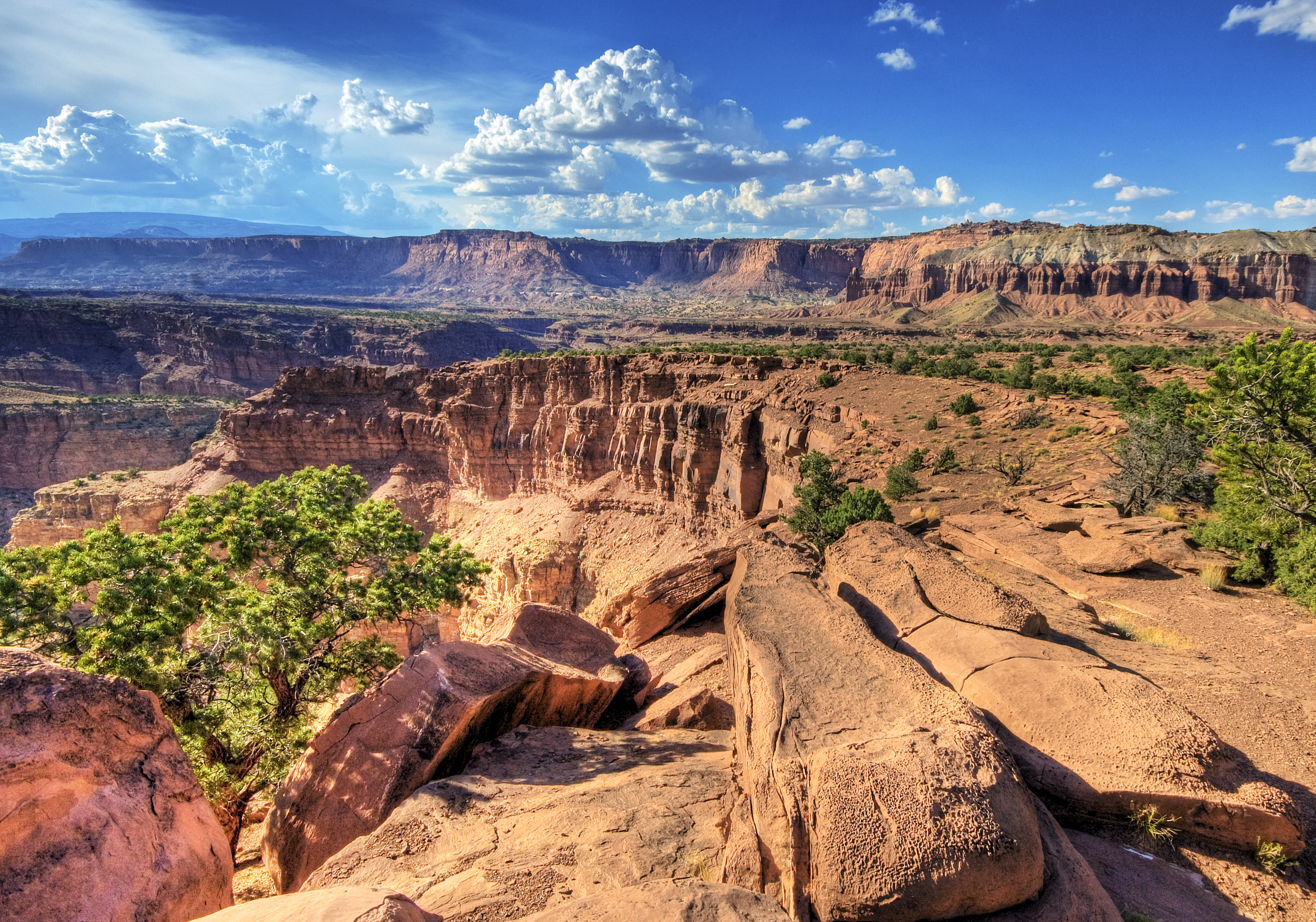
- Capitol Reef National Park
- Interactive map of Capitol Reef National Park
- Location: Wayne, Garfield, Sevier, and Emery counties, Utah, United States
- Nearest city: Torrey
- Coordinates: 38°12′N 111°10′W
- Area: 241,904 acres (978.95 km^{2}); 670 acres (270 ha) private
- Established: December 18, 1971; 54 years ago
- Visitors: 1,422,490 (in 2024)
- Governing body: National Park Service
- Website: nps.gov/care

Capitol Reef National Park is a national park of the United States in south-central Utah. The park is approximately 60 miles (100 km) long on its north–south axis and just 6 miles (10 km) wide on its east-west axis, on average. The park was established in 1971 to preserve 241,904 acres (377.98 sq mi; 97,895.08 ha; 978.95 km^{2}) of desert landscape and is open all year, with May through September receiving the most visitors.

Partially in Wayne County, Utah, the area was originally named "Wayne Wonderland" in the 1920s by local boosters Ephraim P. Pectol and Joseph S. Hickman. Capitol Reef National Park was designated a national monument on August 2, 1937, by President Franklin D. Roosevelt to protect the area's colorful canyons, ridges, buttes, and monoliths; however, it was not until 1950 that the area officially opened to the public. Road access was improved in 1962 with the construction of State Route 24 through the Fremont River Canyon.

The majority of the nearly 100-mile-long (160-kilometer) up-thrust formation called the Waterpocket Fold—a rocky spine extending from Thousand Lake Mountain to Lake Powell—is preserved within the park. Capitol Reef is an especially rugged and spectacular segment of the Waterpocket Fold by the Fremont River. The park was named for its whitish Navajo Sandstone cliffs with dome formations—similar to the white domes often placed on capitol buildings—that run from the Fremont River to Pleasant Creek on the Waterpocket Fold. Locally, reef refers to any rocky barrier to land travel, just as ocean reefs are barriers to sea travel.

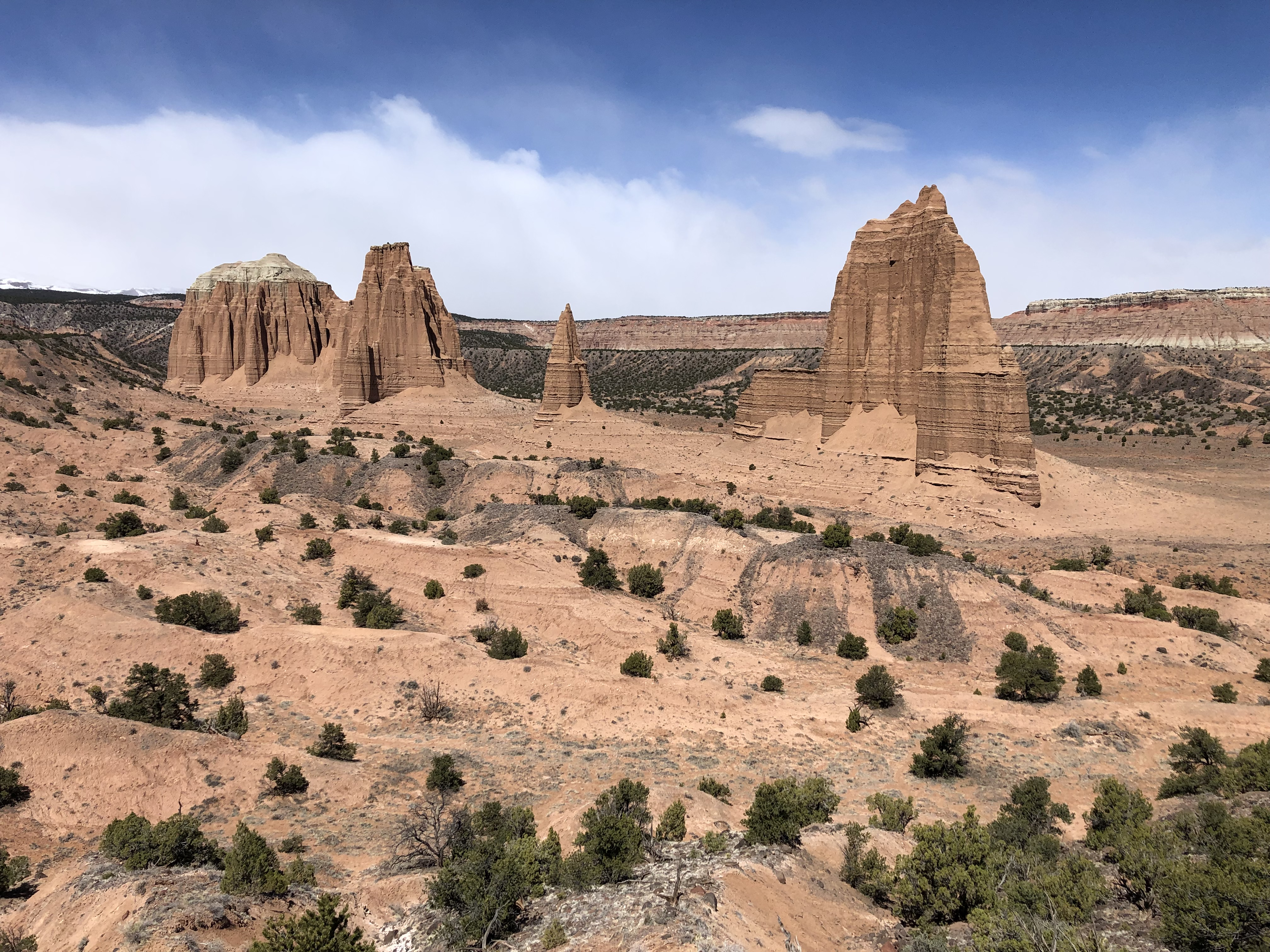
Cathedral Valley

== Geography ==
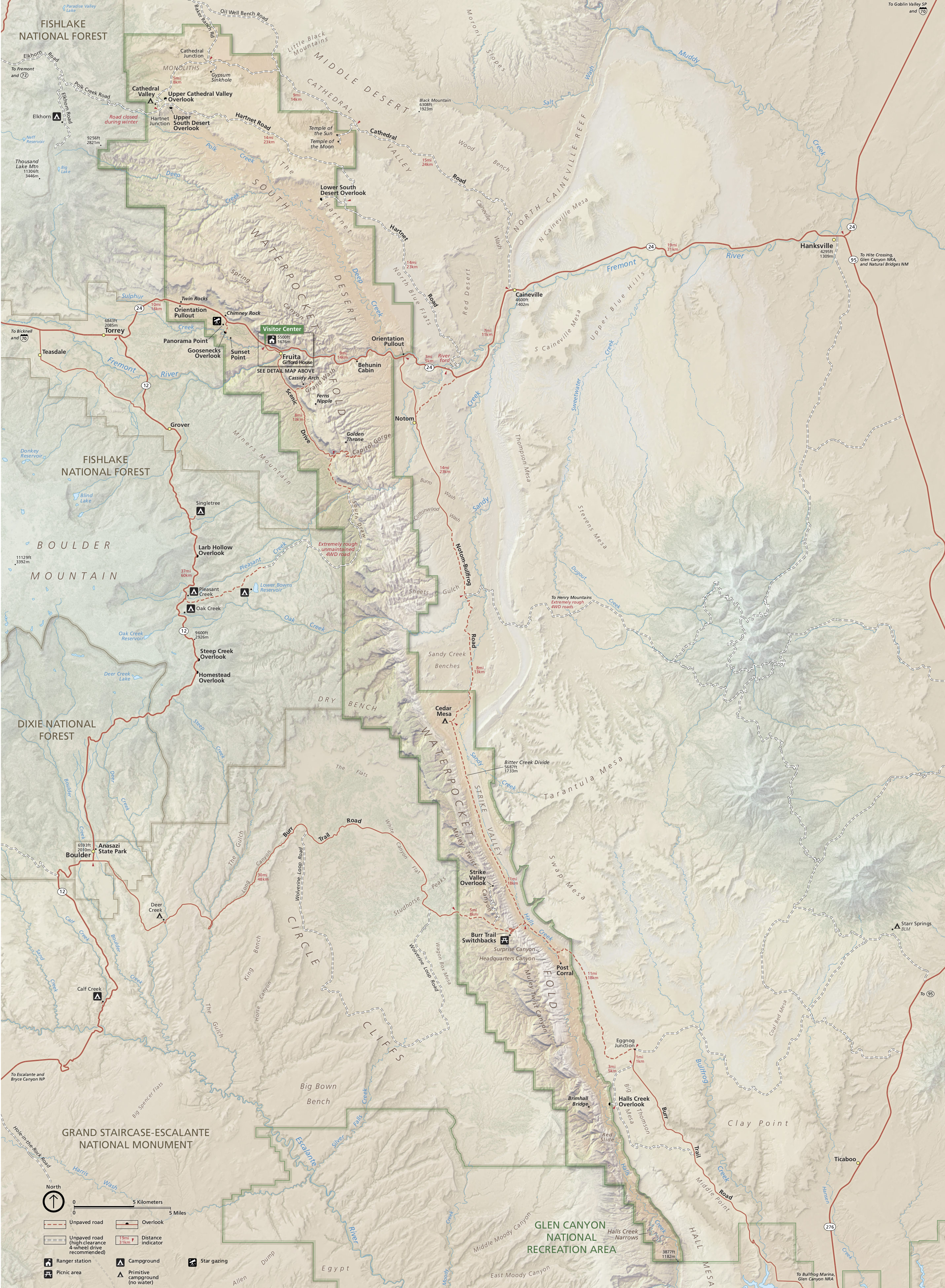
Park map

Capitol Reef encompasses the Waterpocket Fold, a warp in the Earth's crust that is 65 million years old. It is the largest exposed monocline in North America. In this fold, newer and older layers of earth folded over each other in an S-shape. This warp, probably caused by the same colliding continental plates that created the Rocky Mountains, has weathered and eroded over millennia to expose layers of rock and fossils. The park is filled with brilliantly colored sandstone cliffs, gleaming white domes, and contrasting layers of stone and earth.

The area was named for a line of white domes and cliffs of Navajo Sandstone, each of which looks somewhat like the United States Capitol building, that run from the Fremont River to Pleasant Creek on the Waterpocket Fold.

The fold forms a north-to-south barrier that has barely been breached by roads. Early settlers referred to parallel impassable ridges as "reefs", from which the park gets the second half of its name. The first paved road through the area was constructed in 1962. State Route 24 cuts through the park traveling east-and-west between Canyonlands National Park and Bryce Canyon National Park, but few other paved roads exist in the rugged landscape.

The park is filled with canyons, cliffs, towers, domes, and arches. The Fremont River has cut canyons through parts of the Waterpocket Fold, but most of the park is arid desert.

== History ==
=== Native Americans and Mormons ===
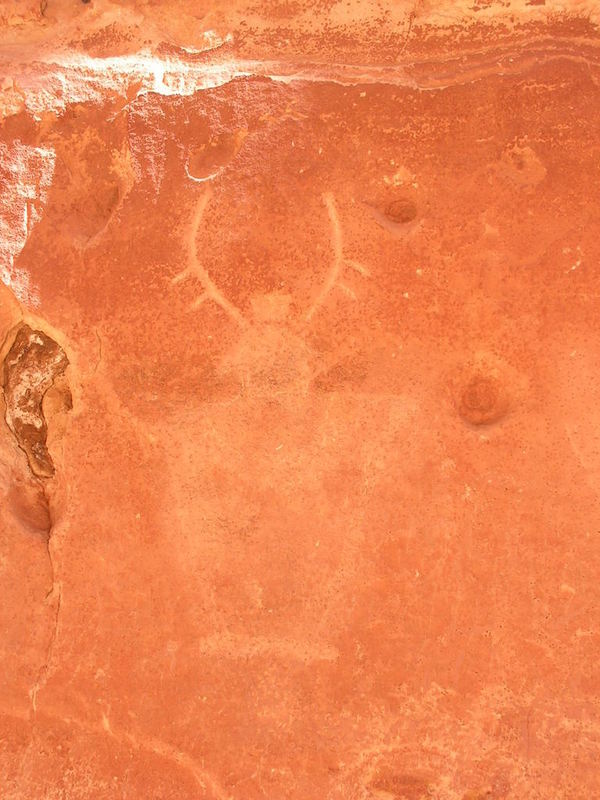
Petroglyph in Capitol Gorge

Fremont-culture Native Americans lived near the perennial Fremont River in the northern part of the Capitol Reef Waterpocket Fold around the year 1000. They irrigated crops of maize and squash and stored their grain in stone granaries (in part made from the numerous black basalt boulders that litter the area). In the 13th century, all of the Native American cultures in this area underwent sudden change, likely due to a long drought. The Fremont settlements and fields were abandoned.

Many years after the Fremont left, Paiutes moved into the area. These Numic-speaking people named the Fremont granaries moki huts and thought they were the homes of a race of tiny people or moki.

In 1872 Almon H. Thompson, a geographer attached to United States Army Major John Wesley Powell's expedition, crossed the Waterpocket Fold while exploring the area. Geologist Clarence Dutton later spent several summers studying the area's geology. None of these expeditions explored the Waterpocket Fold to any great extent.

Following the American Civil War, officials of the Church of Jesus Christ of Latter-day Saints in Salt Lake City sought to establish missions in the remotest niches of the Intermountain West. In 1866, a quasi-military expedition of Mormons in pursuit of natives penetrated the high valleys to the west. In the 1870s, settlers moved into these valleys, eventually establishing Loa, Fremont, Lyman, Bicknell, and Torrey.

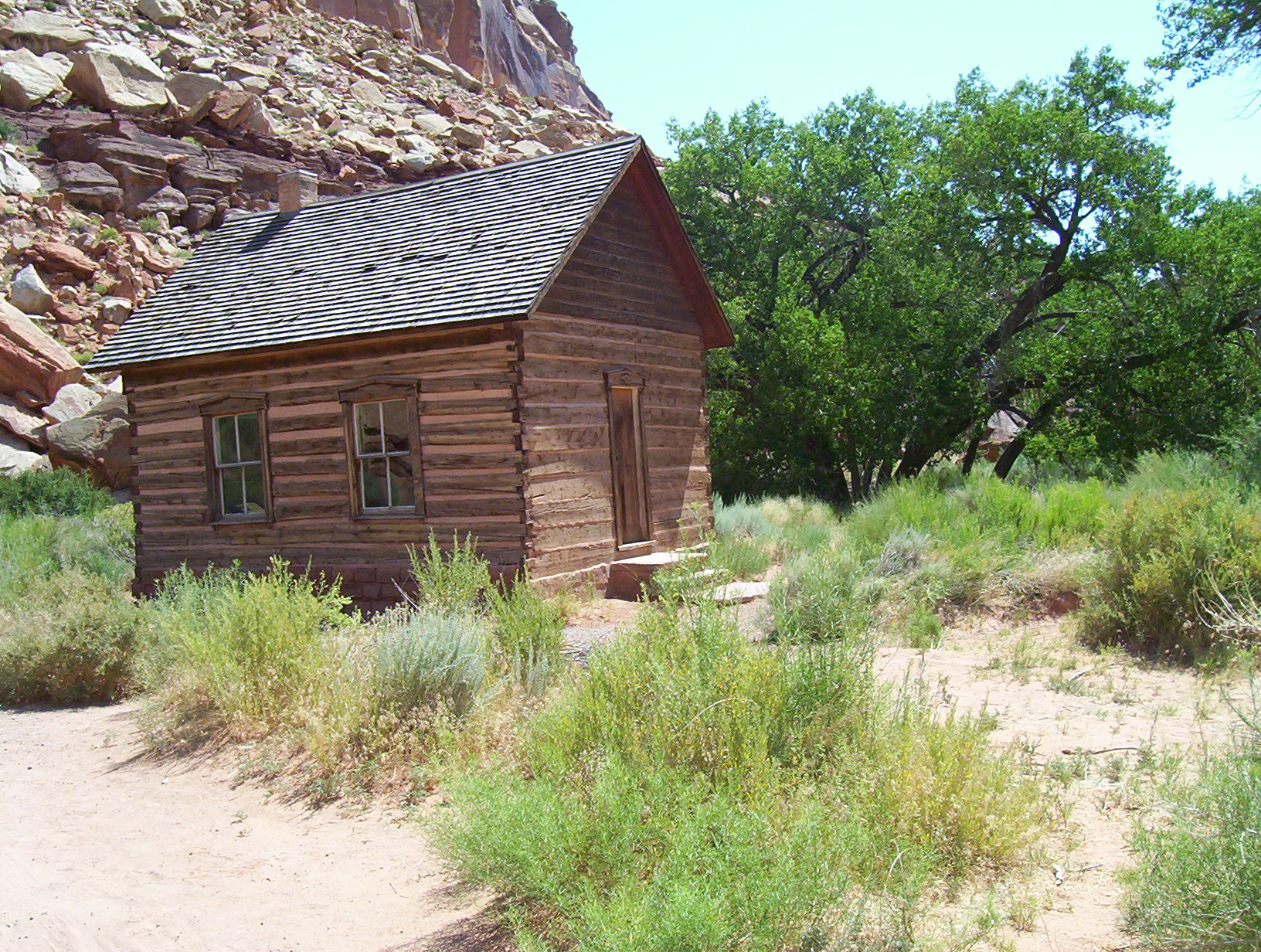
Fruita School House

Mormons settled the Fremont River valley in the 1880s and established Junction (later renamed Fruita), Caineville, and Aldridge. Fruita prospered, Caineville barely survived, and Aldridge died. In addition to farming, lime was extracted from local limestone, and uranium was extracted early in the 20th century. In 1904, the first claim to a uranium mine in the area was staked. The resulting Oyler Mine in Grand Wash produced uranium ore.

By 1920 no more than ten families at one time were sustained by the fertile flood plain of the Fremont River, and the land changed ownership over the years. The area remained isolated. The community was later abandoned, and later still some buildings were restored by the National Park Service. Kilns once used to produce lime still exist in Sulphur Creek and near the campgrounds on Scenic Drive.

=== Early protection efforts ===
Local Ephraim Portman Pectol organized a "booster club" in Torrey in 1921. Pectol pressed a promotional campaign, furnishing stories to be sent to periodicals and newspapers. In his efforts, he was increasingly aided by his brother-in-law, Joseph S. Hickman, who was the Wayne County High School principal. In 1924, Hickman extended community involvement in the promotional effort by organizing a Wayne County–wide Wayne Wonderland Club. That same year, Hickman was elected to the Utah State Legislature.

In 1933, Pectol was elected to the presidency of the Associated Civics Club of Southern Utah, successor to the Wayne Wonderland Club. The club raised $150 (equivalent to $3,731 in 2025) to interest a Salt Lake City photographer in taking a series of promotional photographs. For several years, the photographer, J. E. Broaddus, traveled and lectured on "Wayne Wonderland".

In 1933, Pectol was elected to the legislature and almost immediately contacted President Franklin D. Roosevelt and asked for the creation of "Wayne Wonderland National Monument" out of the federal lands comprising the bulk of the Capitol Reef area. Federal agencies began a feasibility study and boundary assessment. Meanwhile, Pectol guided the government investigators on numerous trips and escorted an increasing number of visitors. The lectures of Broaddus were having an effect.

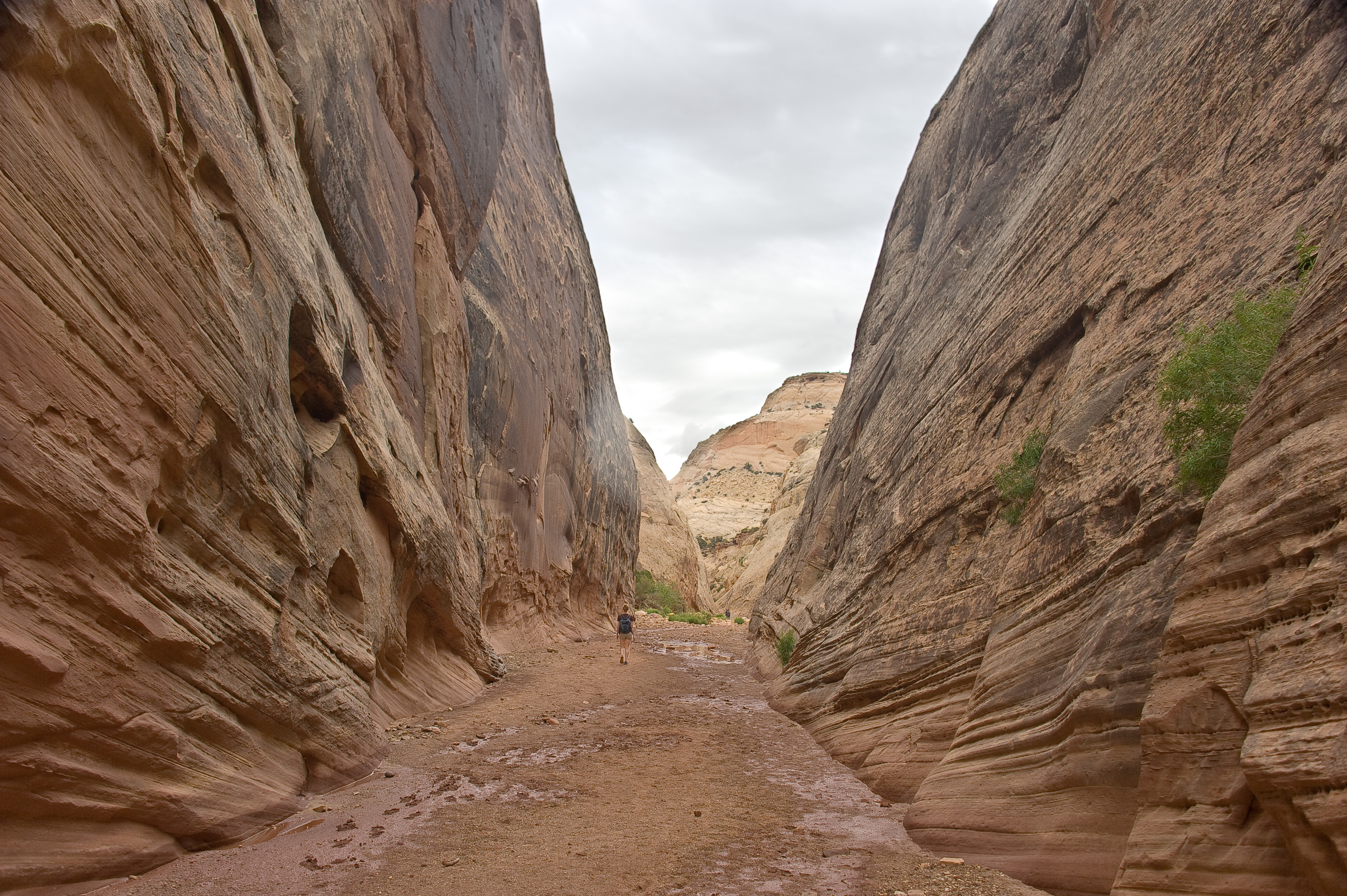
Capitol Gorge

Roosevelt signed a proclamation creating Capitol Reef National Monument on August 2, 1937. In Proclamation 2246, President Roosevelt set aside 37,711 acres (15,261 ha) of the Capitol Reef area. This comprised an area extending about two miles (3 km) north of present State Route 24 and about 10 mi (16 km) south, just past Capitol Gorge. The Great Depression years were lean ones for the National Park Service (NPS), the new administering agency. Funds for the administration of Capitol Reef were nonexistent; it was a long time before the first rangers arrived.

=== Administration of the monument ===
Administration of the new monument was placed under the control of Zion National Park. A stone ranger cabin and the Sulphur Creek bridge were built and some road work was performed by the Civilian Conservation Corps and the Works Progress Administration. Historian and printer Charles Kelly came to know NPS officials at Zion well and volunteered to watchdog the park for the NPS. Kelly was officially appointed custodian-without-pay in 1943. He worked as a volunteer until 1950, when the NPS offered him a civil-service appointment as the first superintendent.

During the 1950s, Kelly was deeply troubled by NPS management acceding to demands of the U.S. Atomic Energy Commission that Capitol Reef National Monument be opened to uranium prospecting. He felt that the decision had been a mistake and destructive of the long-term national interest. It turned out that there was not enough ore in the monument to be worth mining.

In 1958, Kelly got additional permanent help in protecting the monument and enforcing regulations; Park Ranger Grant Clark transferred from Zion. The year Clark arrived, fifty-six thousand visitors came to the park, and Charlie Kelly retired for the last time.

During the 1960s (under the program name Mission 66), NPS areas nationwide received new facilities to meet the demand of mushrooming park visitation. At Capitol Reef, a 53-site campground at Fruita, staff rental housing, and a new visitor center were built, the latter opening in 1966.

Visitation climbed dramatically after the paved, all-weather State Route 24 was built in 1962 through the Fremont River canyon near Fruita. State Route 24 replaced the narrow Capitol Gorge wagon road about 10 miles (16 km) to the south that frequently washed out. The old road has since been open only to foot traffic. In 1967, 146,598 persons visited the park. The staff was also growing.

During the 1960s, the NPS purchased private land parcels at Fruita and Pleasant Creek. Almost all private property passed into public ownership on a "willing buyer-willing seller" basis.

Preservationists convinced President Lyndon B. Johnson to set aside an enormous area of public lands in 1968, just before he left office. In Presidential Proclamation 3888, an additional 215,056 acres (87,030 ha) were placed under NPS control. By 1970, Capitol Reef National Monument comprised 254,251 acres (102,892 ha) and sprawled southeast from Thousand Lake Mountain almost to the Colorado River. The action was controversial locally, and NPS staffing at the monument was inadequate to properly manage the additional land.

=== National park status ===
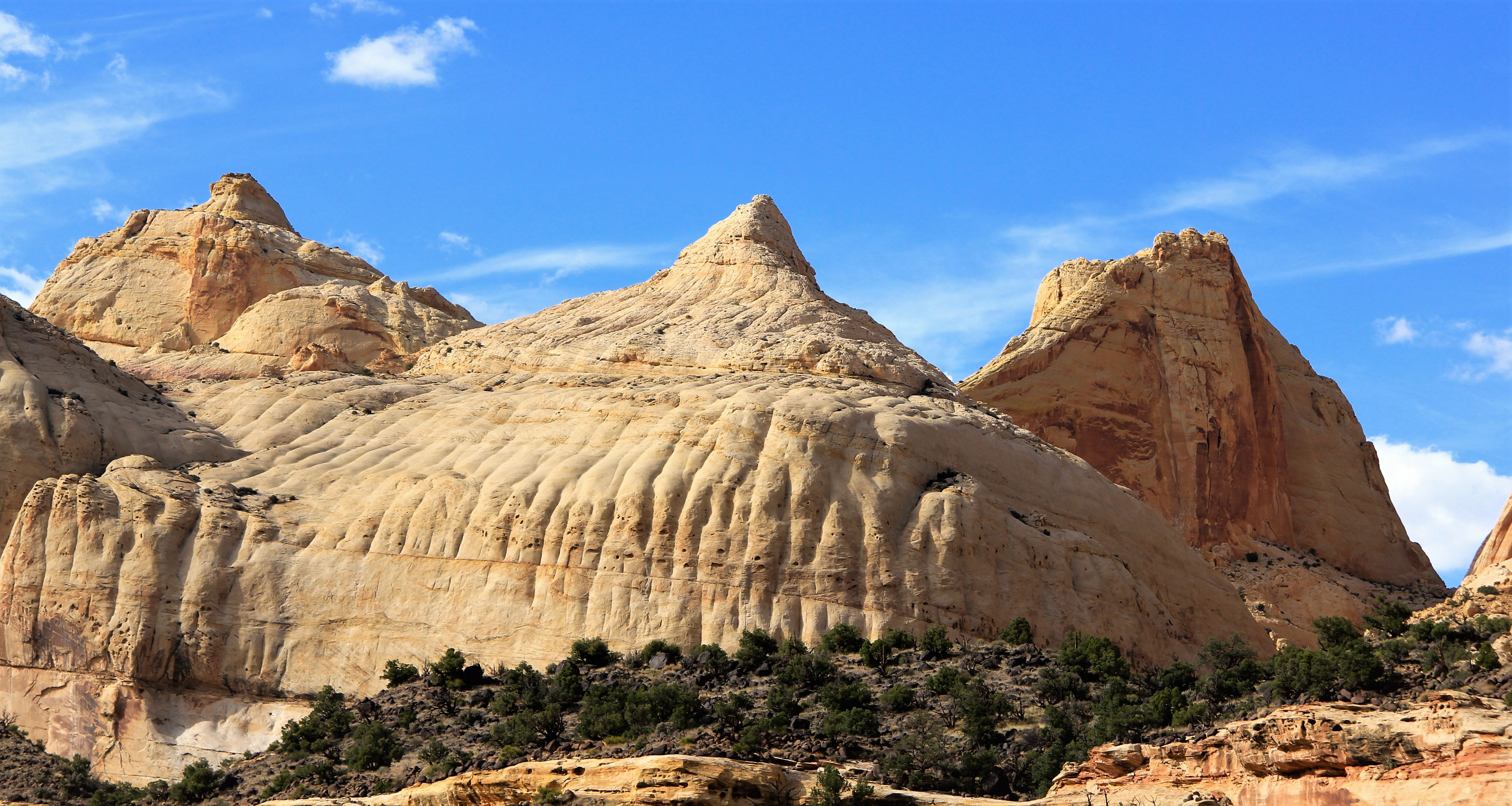
Navajo Dome formation

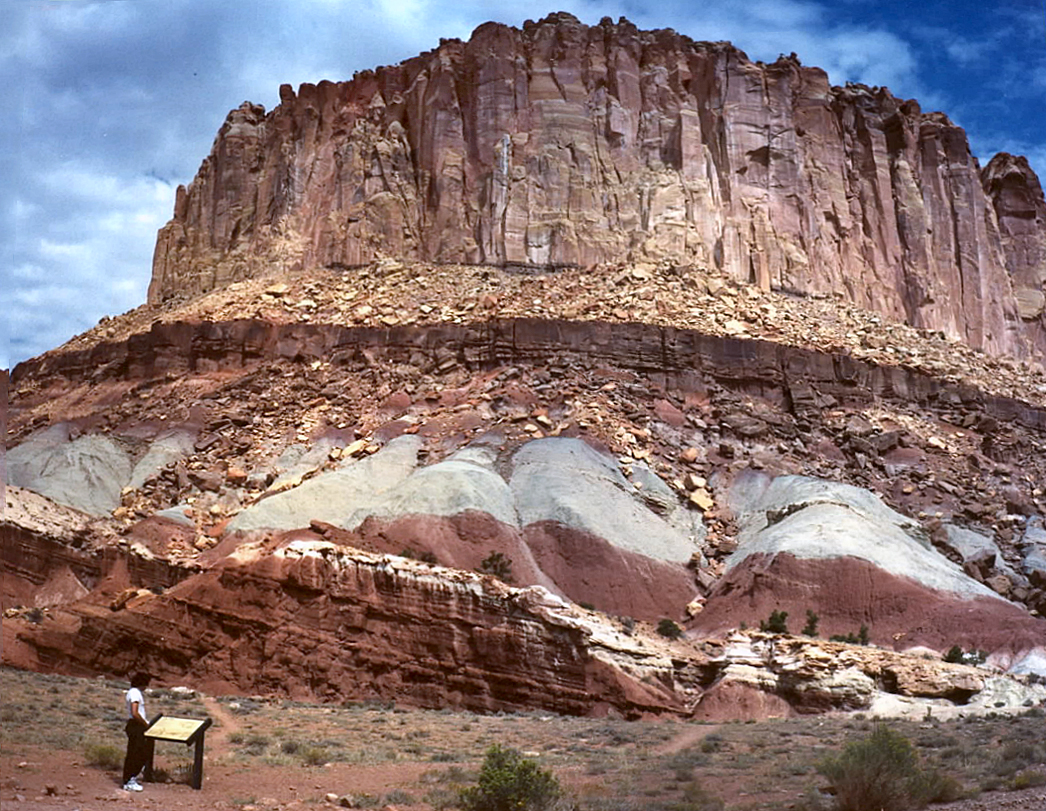
Tower and rock layers at Capitol Reef

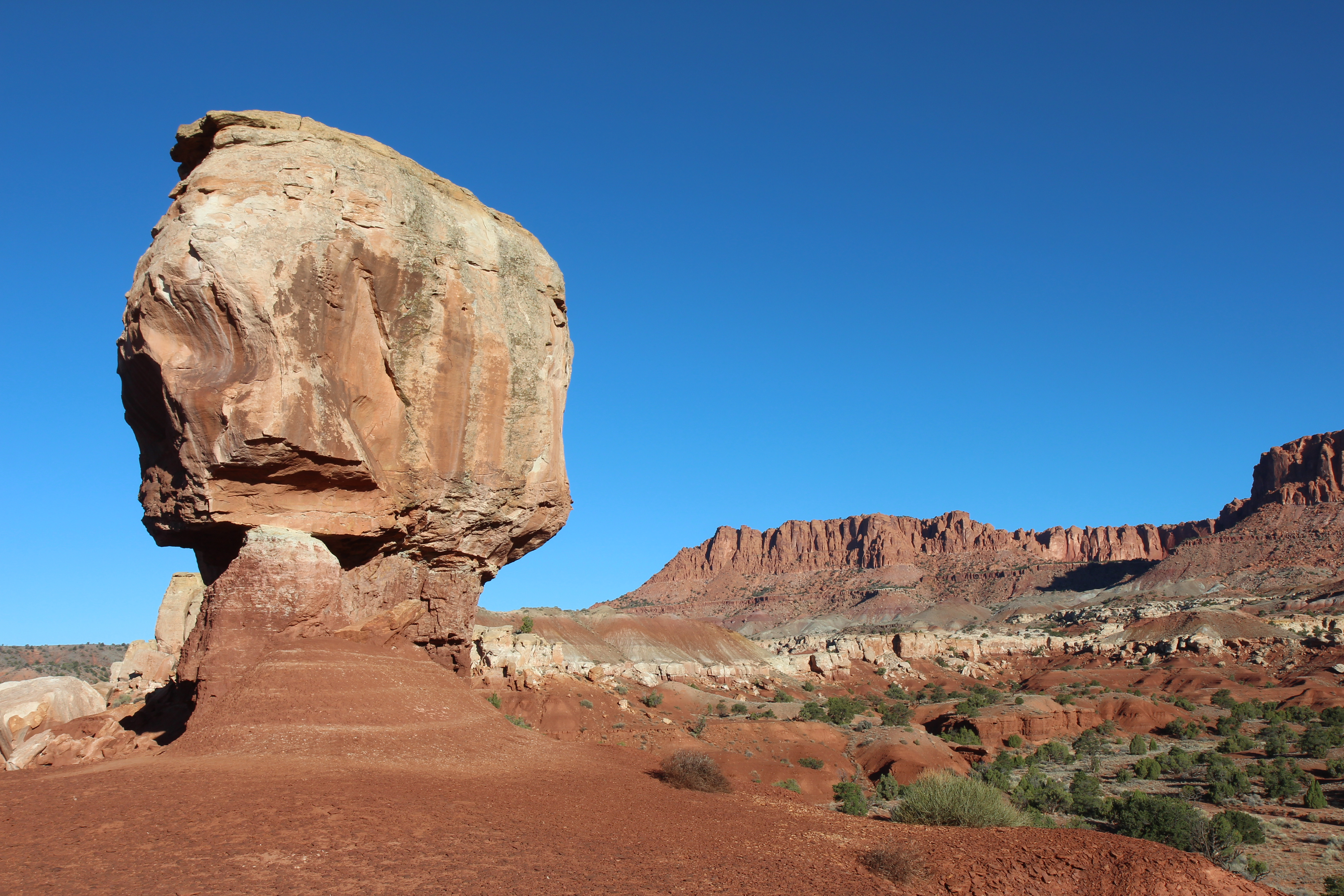
One of the Twin Rocks in Capitol Reef National Park.

The vast enlargement of the monument and diversification of the scenic resources soon raised another issue: whether Capitol Reef should be a national park, rather than a monument. Two bills were introduced into the United States Congress.

A House bill (H.R. 17152) introduced by Utah Congressman Laurence J. Burton called for a 180,000-acre (72,800 ha) national park and an adjunct 48,000-acre (19,400 ha) national recreation area where multiple use (including grazing) could continue indefinitely. In the United States Senate, meanwhile, Senate bill S. 531 had already passed on July 1, 1970, and provided for a 230,000-acre (93,100 ha) national park alone. The bill called for a 25-year phase-out of grazing.

In September 1970, United States Department of Interior officials told a house subcommittee session that they preferred about 254,000 acres (103,000 ha) be set aside as a national park. They also recommended that the grazing phase-out period be 10 years, rather than 25. They did not favor the adjunct recreation area.

It was not until late 1971 that Congressional action was completed. By then, the 92nd United States Congress was in session and S. 531 had languished. A new bill, S. 29, was introduced in the Senate by Senator Frank E. Moss of Utah and was essentially the same as the defunct S. 531 except that it called for an additional 10,834 acres (4,384 ha) of public lands for a Capitol Reef National Park. In the House, Utah Representative K. Gunn McKay (with Representative Lloyd) had introduced H.R. 9053 to replace the dead H.R. 17152. This time, the House bill dropped the concept of an adjunct Capitol Reef National Recreation Area and adopted the Senate concept of a 25-year limit on continued grazing. The Department of Interior was still recommending a national park of 254,368 acres (102,939 ha) and a 10-year limit for grazing phase-out.

S. 29 passed the Senate in June and was sent to the House, which dropped its own bill and passed the Senate version with an amendment. Because the Senate was not in agreement with the House amendment, differences were worked out in Conference Committee. The Conference Committee issued its report on November 30, 1971, and the bill passed both houses of Congress. The legislation—"An Act to Establish The Capitol Reef National Park in the State of Utah"—became Public Law 92-207 when it was signed by President Richard Nixon on December 18, 1971.

== Dark Sky Park ==
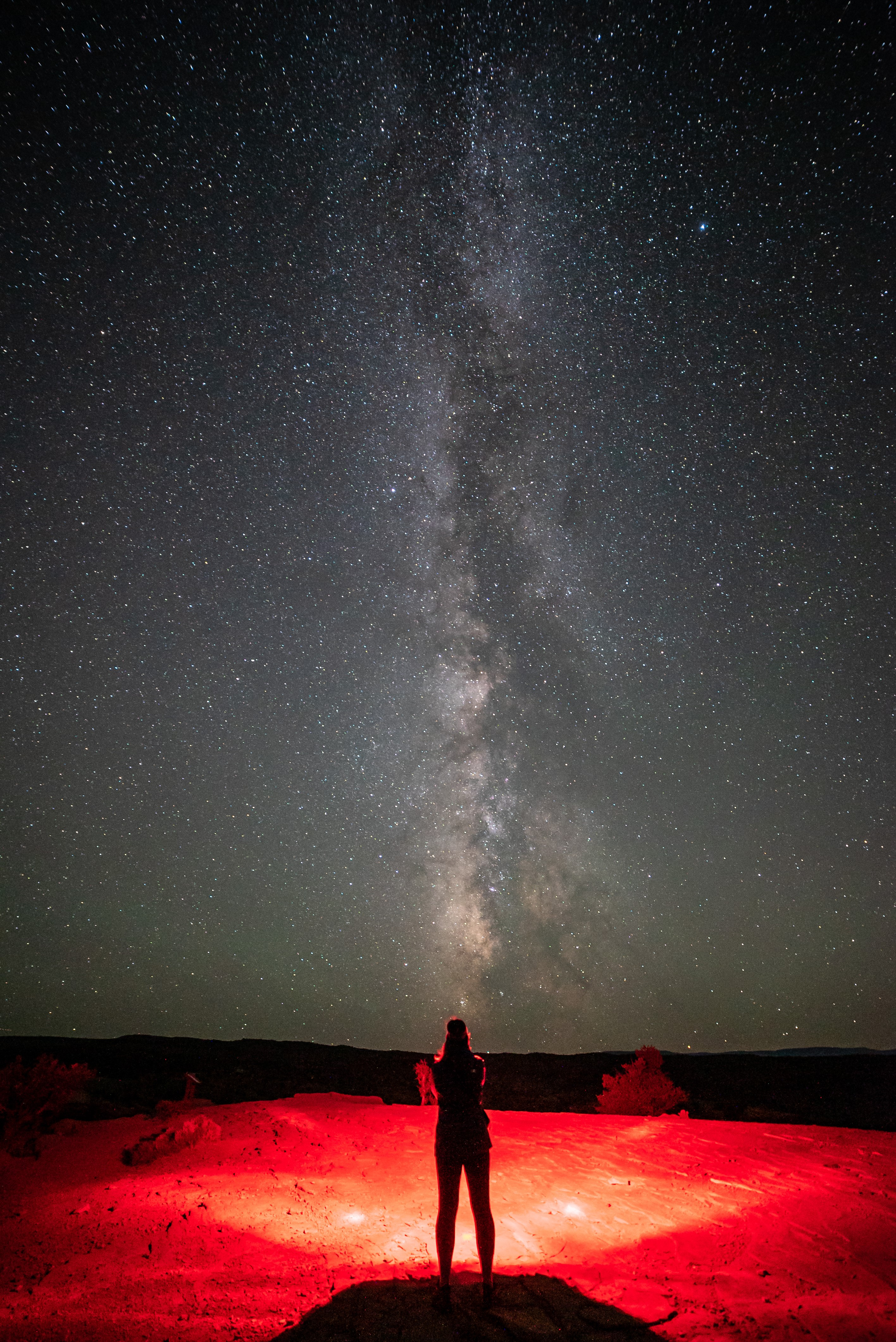
The Milky Way at Capitol Reef

In April 2015, Capitol Reef National Park was designated a "Gold Tier" Dark Sky Park due to its remote location and minimal use of artificial lighting.

== Climate ==
According to the Köppen climate classification system, the Capitol Reef Visitor Center has a cold semi-arid climate (BSk).

Climate data for Capitol Reef National Park, Utah, 1991–2020 normals, extremes 1938–present
| Month | Jan | Feb | Mar | Apr | May | Jun | Jul | Aug | Sep | Oct | Nov | Dec | Year |
|---|---|---|---|---|---|---|---|---|---|---|---|---|---|
| Record high °F (°C) | 69 (21) | 72 (22) | 89 (32) | 91 (33) | 97 (36) | 104 (40) | 104 (40) | 104 (40) | 99 (37) | 91 (33) | 77 (25) | 69 (21) | 104 (40) |
| Mean maximum °F (°C) | 54.1 (12.3) | 59.7 (15.4) | 71.8 (22.1) | 80.3 (26.8) | 87.9 (31.1) | 97.0 (36.1) | 99.2 (37.3) | 96.0 (35.6) | 91.0 (32.8) | 81.6 (27.6) | 65.3 (18.5) | 55.0 (12.8) | 99.7 (37.6) |
| Mean daily maximum °F (°C) | 40.6 (4.8) | 46.8 (8.2) | 57.3 (14.1) | 64.7 (18.2) | 74.3 (23.5) | 86.4 (30.2) | 91.2 (32.9) | 87.8 (31.0) | 79.7 (26.5) | 65.9 (18.8) | 51.0 (10.6) | 40.2 (4.6) | 65.5 (18.6) |
| Daily mean °F (°C) | 30.5 (−0.8) | 36.2 (2.3) | 45.4 (7.4) | 51.9 (11.1) | 61.3 (16.3) | 72.3 (22.4) | 78.2 (25.7) | 75.3 (24.1) | 67.2 (19.6) | 54.5 (12.5) | 40.7 (4.8) | 30.4 (−0.9) | 53.7 (12.1) |
| Mean daily minimum °F (°C) | 20.5 (−6.4) | 25.7 (−3.5) | 33.6 (0.9) | 39.2 (4.0) | 48.3 (9.1) | 58.2 (14.6) | 65.2 (18.4) | 62.8 (17.1) | 54.7 (12.6) | 43.1 (6.2) | 30.4 (−0.9) | 20.6 (−6.3) | 41.9 (5.5) |
| Mean minimum °F (°C) | 8.6 (−13.0) | 14.3 (−9.8) | 22.5 (−5.3) | 28.5 (−1.9) | 36.2 (2.3) | 46.4 (8.0) | 56.9 (13.8) | 55.5 (13.1) | 43.1 (6.2) | 30.0 (−1.1) | 18.4 (−7.6) | 10.2 (−12.1) | 6.8 (−14.0) |
| Record low °F (°C) | −9 (−23) | −7 (−22) | 10 (−12) | 18 (−8) | 28 (−2) | 35 (2) | 44 (7) | 42 (6) | 30 (−1) | 12 (−11) | 5 (−15) | −8 (−22) | −9 (−23) |
| Average precipitation inches (mm) | 0.56 (14) | 0.50 (13) | 0.46 (12) | 0.52 (13) | 0.65 (17) | 0.35 (8.9) | 1.03 (26) | 1.12 (28) | 0.95 (24) | 0.87 (22) | 0.50 (13) | 0.37 (9.4) | 7.88 (200) |
| Average snowfall inches (cm) | 3.8 (9.7) | 1.5 (3.8) | 1.7 (4.3) | 0.2 (0.51) | 0.0 (0.0) | 0.0 (0.0) | 0.0 (0.0) | 0.0 (0.0) | 0.0 (0.0) | 0.0 (0.0) | 1.5 (3.8) | 2.2 (5.6) | 10.9 (28) |
| Average precipitation days (≥ 0.01 in) | 3.3 | 3.7 | 3.6 | 4.5 | 4.9 | 3.3 | 7.7 | 8.1 | 5.3 | 4.5 | 2.7 | 2.9 | 54.5 |
| Average snowy days (≥ 0.1 in) | 1.9 | 1.3 | 0.8 | 0.3 | 0.1 | 0.0 | 0.0 | 0.0 | 0.0 | 0.0 | 0.7 | 1.8 | 6.9 |
Source: NOAA

== Geology ==
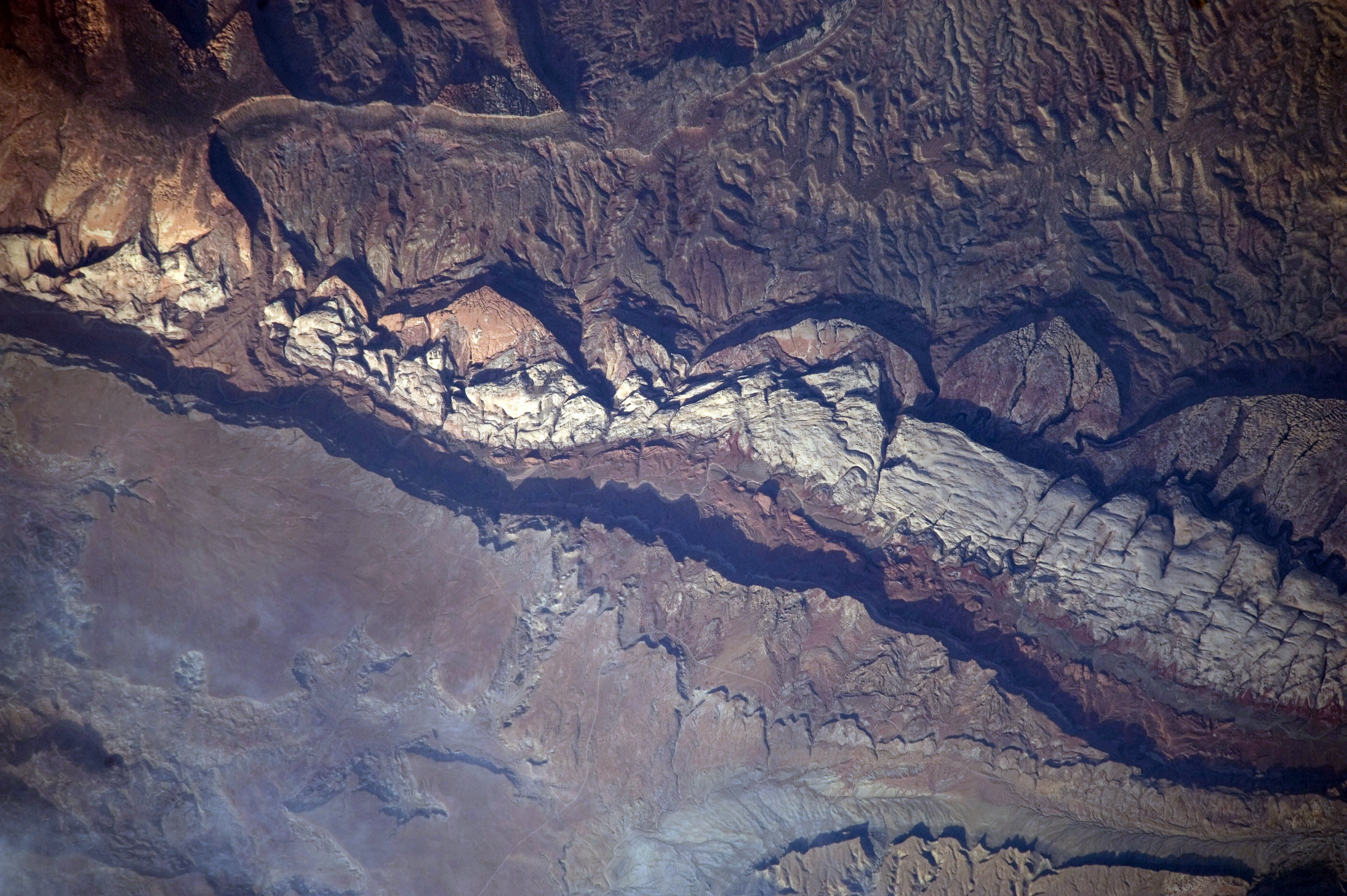
Waterpocket Fold from the ISS

The area including the park was once the edge of a shallow sea that invaded the land in the Permian, creating the Cutler Formation. Only the sandstone of the youngest member of the Cutler Formation, the White Rim, is exposed in the park. The deepening sea left carbonate deposits, forming the Kaibab Limestone, the same formation that rims the Grand Canyon to the southwest.

During the Triassic, streams deposited reddish-brown silt that later became the siltstone of the Moenkopi Formation. Uplift and erosion followed. Conglomerate, followed by logs, sand, mud, and wind-transported volcanic ash, then formed the uranium-containing Chinle Formation.

The members of the Glen Canyon Group were all laid down in the middle- to late-Triassic during a time of increasing aridity. They include:

- Wingate Sandstone: sand dunes on the shore of an ancient sea
- Kayenta Formation: thin-bedded layers of sand deposited by slow-moving streams in channels and across low plains
- Navajo Sandstone: huge fossilized sand dunes from a massive Sahara-like desert.

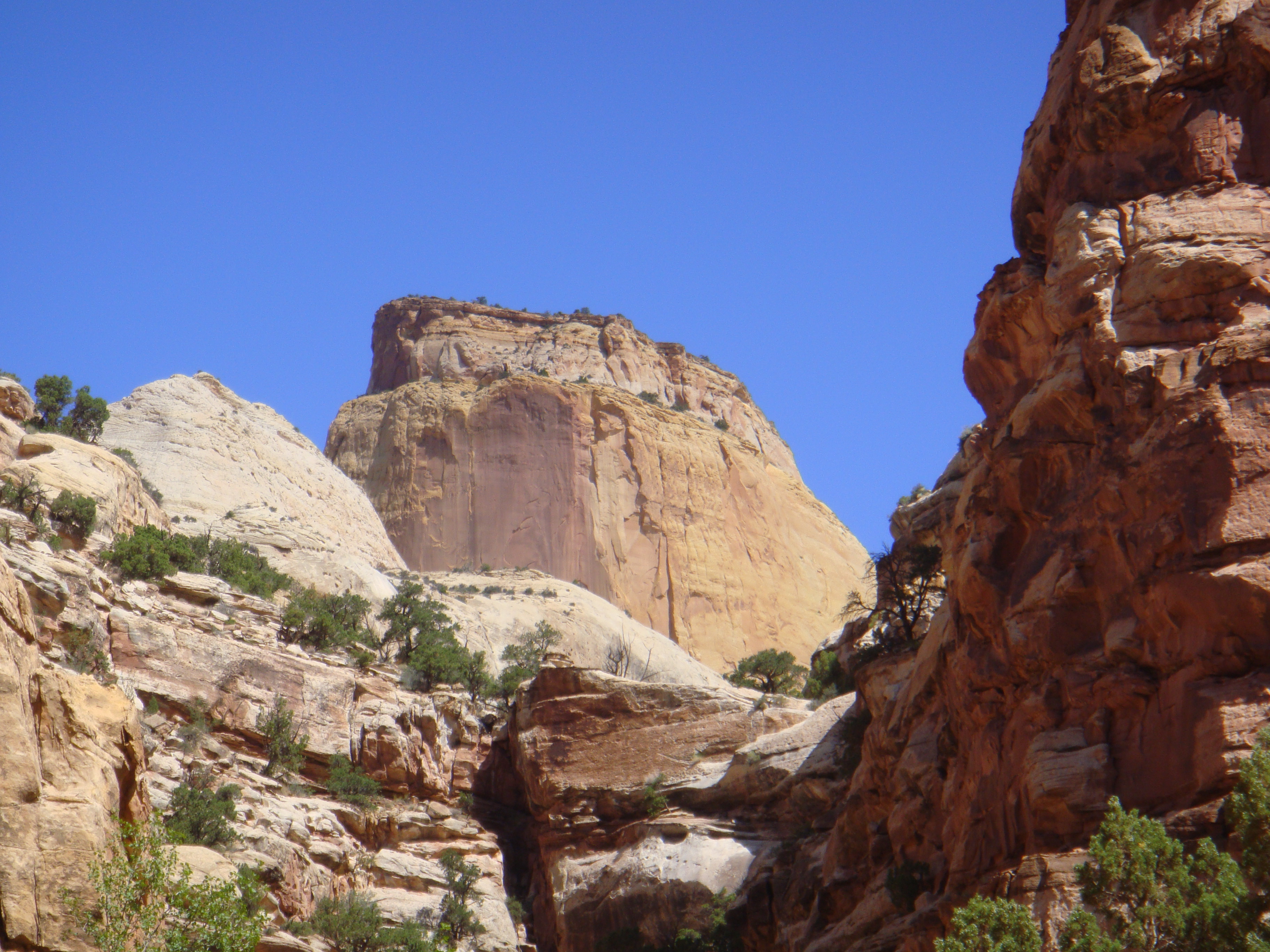
The Golden Throne. Though Capitol Reef is famous for white domes of Navajo Sandstone, this dome's color is a result of a lingering section of yellow Carmel Formation carbonate, which has stained the underlying rock.

The San Rafael Group consists of four Jurassic-period formations; from oldest to youngest, they are:

- the Carmel Formation: gypsum, sand, and limey silt laid down in what may have been a graben that was periodically flooded by sea water;
- the Entrada Sandstone: sandstone from barrier islands/sand bars in a near-shore environment;
- the Curtis Formation: made from conglomerate, sandstone, and shale; and
- the Summerville Formation: reddish-brown mud and white sand deposited in tidal flats.

Streams once again laid down mud and sand in their channels, on lakebeds, and in swampy plains, creating the Morrison Formation. Early in the Cretaceous, similar non-marine sediments were laid down and became the Dakota Sandstone. Eventually, the Cretaceous Seaway covered the Dakota, depositing the Mancos Shale.

Only small remnants of the Mesaverde Group are found, capping a few mesas in the park's eastern section.

Near the end of the Cretaceous period, a mountain-building event called the Laramide orogeny started to compact and uplift the region, forming the Rocky Mountains and creating monoclines such as the Waterpocket Fold in the park. Ten to fifteen million years ago, the entire region was uplifted much further by the creation of the Colorado Plateau. This uplift was very even. Igneous activity in the form of volcanism and dike and sill intrusion also occurred during this time.

The drainage system in the area was rearranged and steepened, causing streams to downcut faster and sometimes change course. Wetter times during the ice ages of the Pleistocene increased the rate of erosion.

== Flora ==
There are more than 840 species of plants that are found in the park, and over 40 of those species are classified as rare and endemic.

== Visiting the park ==
The closest town to Capitol Reef is Torrey, about 11 miles (18 km) west of the visitor center on Highway 24, slightly west of its intersection with Highway 12. Its 2020 population was less than 300. Torrey has a few motels and restaurants and functions as a gateway town to the park. Highway 12 and a partially unpaved scenic backway named the Burr Trail provide access from the west through the Grand Staircase–Escalante National Monument and the town of Boulder.

== Activities ==
A variety of activities are available to tourists, both ranger-led and self-guided, including auto touring, hiking, backpacking, camping, bicycling (on paved and unpaved roads only; no trails), horseback riding, canyoneering, and rock climbing. The orchards planted by Mormon pioneers are maintained by the National Park Service. From early March to mid-October, various fruit—cherries, apricots, peaches, pears, or apples—can be harvested by visitors for a fee.

=== Hiking and backpacking ===
A hiking-trail guide is available at the visitor center for both day hikes and backcountry hiking. Backcountry access requires a free permit.

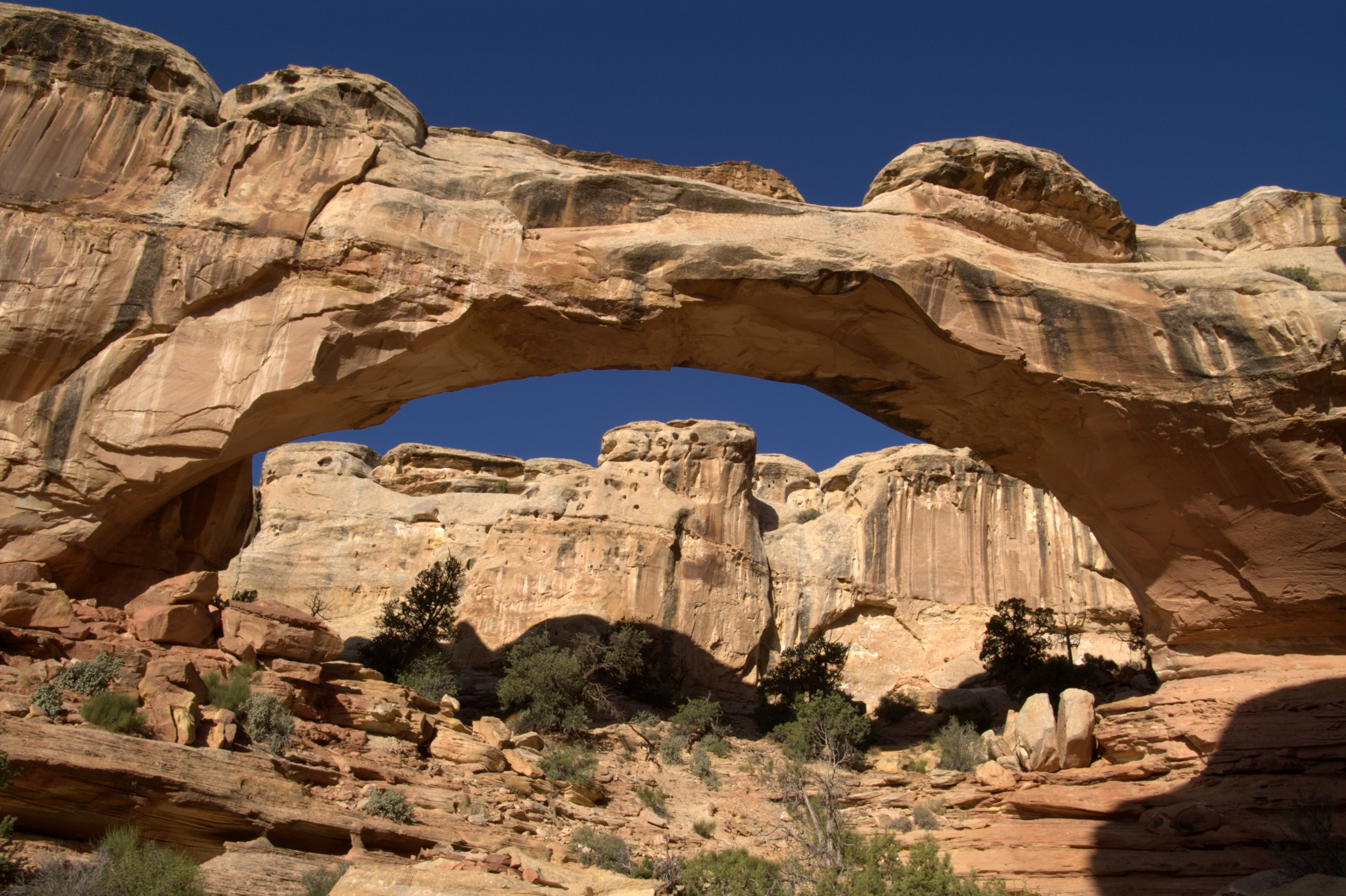
Hickman Natural Bridge

Numerous trails are available for hiking and backpacking in the park, with fifteen in the Fruita District alone. The following trails are some of the most popular in the park:

- Cassidy Arch Trail: a very steep, strenuous, 3.5-mile (5.6 km) round trip that leads into the Grand Wash to an overlook of the Cassidy Arch.
- Grand Wash Trail: a popular easy trail providing access to the Narrows area of the wash. Accessible both from Rt. 24 and from the end of Grand Wash Road, off of the Scenic Drive.
- Hickman Bridge Trail: a 2-mile (3.2 km) round trip leading to the natural bridge.
- Frying Pan Trail: an 8.8-mile (14.2 km) round trip that passes the Cassidy Arch, Grand Wash, and Cohab Canyon.
- Brimhall Natural Bridge: a popular, though strenuous, 4.5-mile (7.2 km) round trip with views of Brimhall Canyon, the Waterpocket Fold, and Brimhall Natural Bridge.
- Halls Creek Narrows: 22 miles (35 km) long and considered strenuous, with many side canyons and creeks; typically hiked as a 2-3 day camping trip.

=== Auto touring ===
Visitors may explore several of the main areas of the park by private vehicle:

- Scenic Drive: a 7.9-mile (12.7 km) paved road winds through the middle of the park, passing the major points of interest; the road is accessible from the visitor center to approximately 2 miles (3.2 km) into the Capitol Gorge.
- Notom-Bullfrog Road: traverses the eastern side of the Waterpocket Fold, along 10 miles (16 km) of paved road, with the remainder unpaved.
- Cathedral Road: an unpaved road through the northern areas of the park, that traverses Cathedral Valley, passing the Temples of the Sun and Moon.

=== Camping ===
The primary camping location is the Fruita campground, with 71 campsites (no water, electrical, or sewer hookups), and restrooms without bathing facilities. The campground also has group sites with picnic areas and restrooms. Two primitive, free camping areas are also available.

=== Canyoneering ===
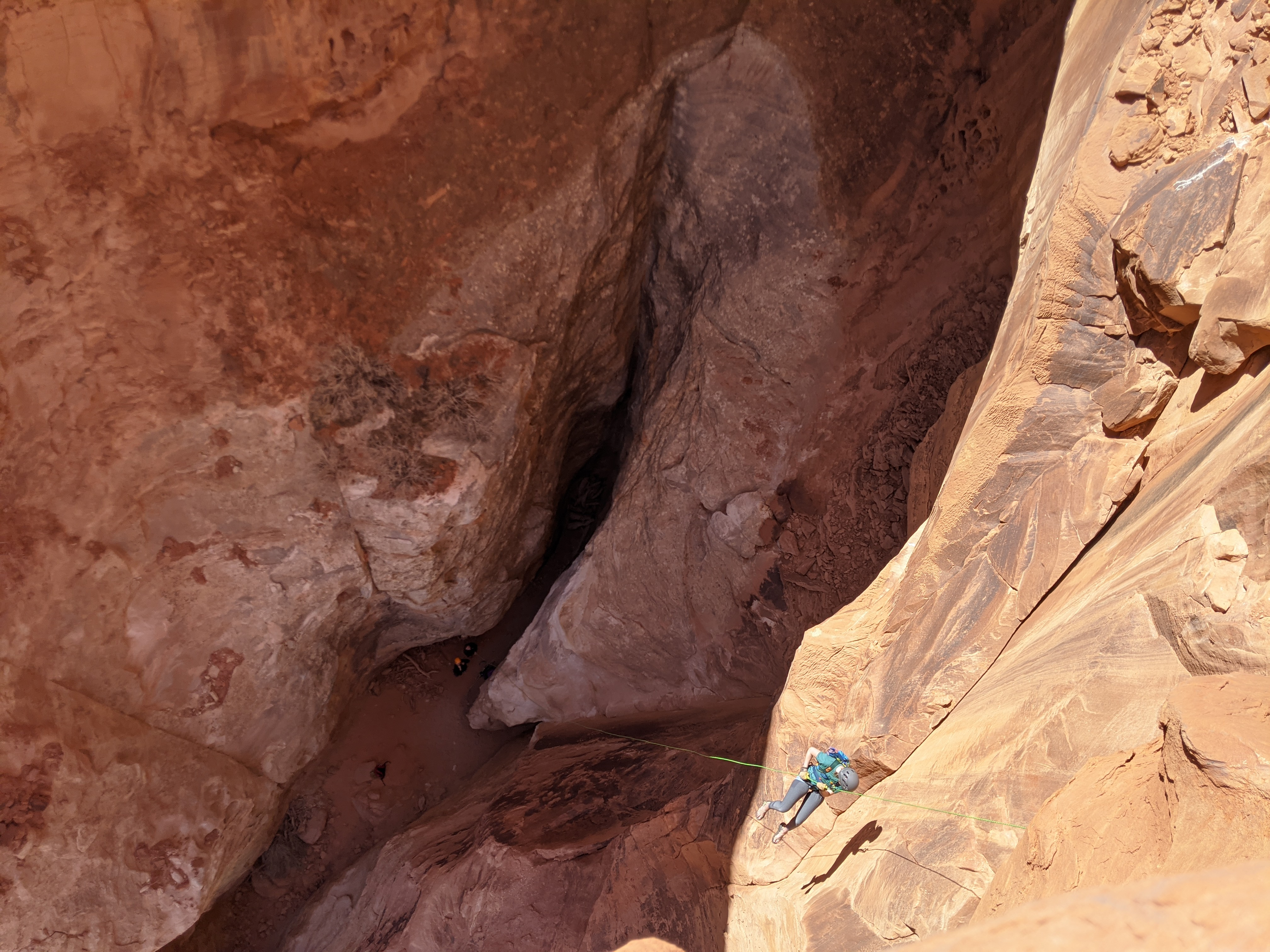
Taken from the top of the first rappel of the Cassidy Arch route.

Canyoneering is growing in popularity in the park. It is a recreational sport that takes one through slot canyons. It involves rappelling and may require swimming and other technical rope work. Day-pass permits are required for canyoneering in the park and can be obtained for free from the visitor center or through email. Each route requires its own permit. If one is planning on canyoneering for multiple days, then passes are required for each day. Overnight camping as part of the canyoneering trip is permitted, but a free backcountry pass must be requested from the visitor center.

It is imperative to plan canyoneering trips around the weather. The Colorado Plateau is susceptible to flash flooding during prime rainy months. Because canyoneering takes place through slot canyons, getting caught in a flash flood could be lethal. Visitors are advised to consult reliable weather sources. The Weather Atlas shows charts with the monthly average rainfall in inches.

Extreme heat during the summer months presents a danger to visitors, who can find weather warnings on the National Weather Service website. The heat levels are detailed by a color and numerical scale (0–4).

One of the most popular canyoneering routes in Capitol Reef National Park is Cassidy Arch Canyon. A paper by George Huddart details the park's commitment to working with citizens to maintain the route as well as the vegetation and rocks. The canyon route is approximately 2.3 miles (3.7 km) long (0.4 miles (0.64 km) of technical work), consisting of 8 different rappels, and takes between 2.5 and 4.5 hours to complete. The first rappel is 140 feet (43 m) and descends below the famous Cassidy Arch.

== See also ==
- List of national parks of the United States
