= Bicknell, Utah =

Town in the state of Utah, United States

- Town
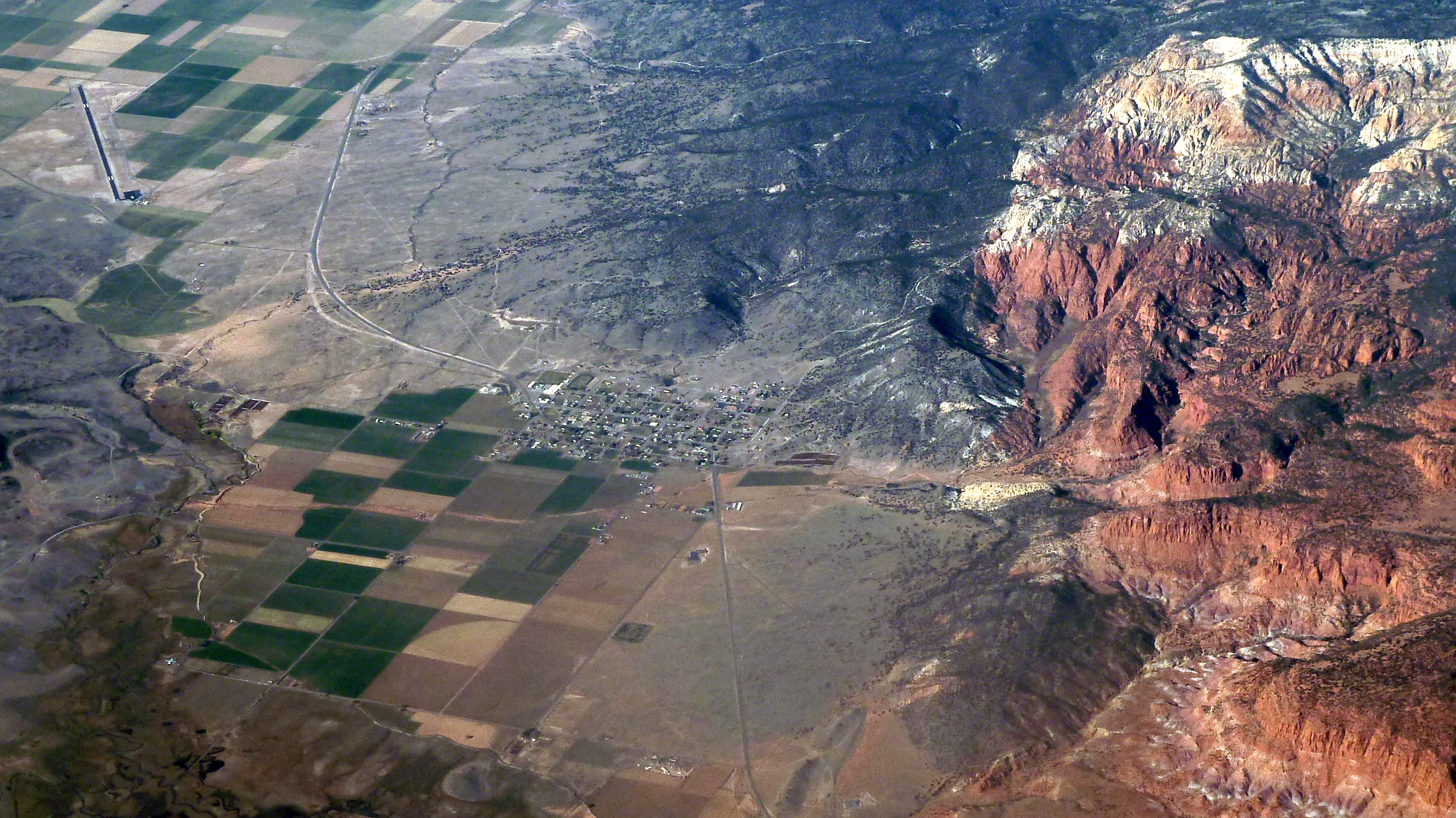
- Aerial photograph of Bicknell

- Location in Wayne County and the state of Utah.

- Location of Utah in the United States
- Coordinates: 38°20′29″N 111°32′44″W
- Country: United States
- State: Utah
- County: Wayne
- Settled: 1879
- Incorporated: 1938
- Founder: Albert King Thurber
- Named for: Thomas W. Bicknell

Area
  - Total: 0.57 sq mi (1.48 km^{2})
  - Land: 0.57 sq mi (1.48 km^{2})
  - Water: 0 sq mi (0.00 km^{2})
- Elevation: 7,123 ft (2,171 m)

Population (2020)
  - Total: 323
  - Density: 586.2/sq mi (226.32/km^{2})
- Time zone: UTC-7 (MST)
  - Summer (DST): UTC-6 (MDT)
- ZIP code: 84715
- Area code: 435
- FIPS code: 49-05490
- GNIS feature ID: 1438623
- Website: www.bicknellutah.gov

Bicknell is a town along State Route 24 in Wayne County, Utah, United States. As of the 2020 census, the town population was 323.

== History ==
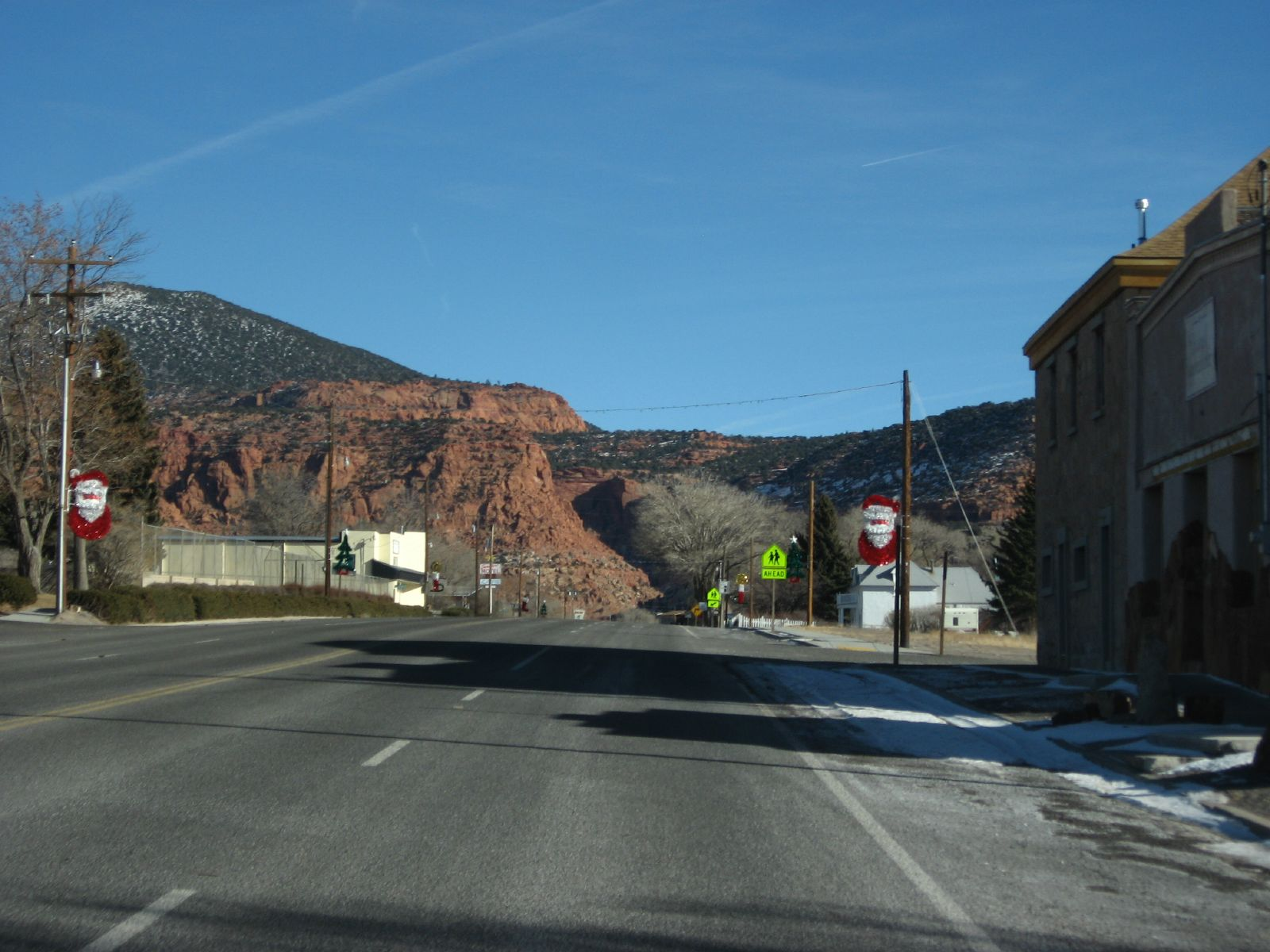

Bicknell was originally called Thurber, or Thurber Town, for A.K. Thurber, who in 1879 built the first house in the area. In 1897 the town moved to a new location due to sandy soil and poor water conditions.

In 1914 Thomas W. Bicknell, a wealthy eastern author, historian, and Education Commissioner for Rhode Island, offered a thousand-volume library to any Utah town that would rename itself after him. The town of Grayson also wanted the library prize, so in a compromise in 1916, Grayson took the name of Blanding, Mr. Bicknell's wife's maiden name, as a tribute to her parents. The two towns split the library, each receiving 500 books.

== Geography ==
According to the United States Census Bureau, the town has a total area of 0.62 square miles (1.6 km^{2}), all land. It is situated at an altitude of 7,125 feet (2,172 m) above sea level, in the Rabbit Valley in south-central Utah. The Fremont River flows through the valley, which lies between 11,305-foot (3,446 m) Thousand Lake Mountain to the north and 11,317-foot (3,449 m) Boulder Mountain to the south. Fishlake National Forest is to the north, and Dixie National Forest is to the south. The Capitol Reef National Park Visitors Center is 17 miles (27 km) to the east.

=== Distances ===
- 120 miles (190 km) northeast of Bryce Canyon National Park
- 110 miles (180 km) southwest of Price
- 165 miles (266 km) west of Moab
- 169 miles (272 km) south of Provo
- 212 miles (341 km) south of Salt Lake City
- 228 miles (367 km) northeast of St. George

=== Area sites ===
- Bicknell Bottoms wildlife habitat and fish hatchery (3.5 miles (5.6 km) SE)
- Boulder Mountain (11,317 feet (3,449 m), 37 miles (60 km) SE)
- Capitol Reef National Park (17 miles (27 km) E)
- Fruita Schoolhouse (20 miles (32 km) E)
- Teasdale Tithing Office and Granary (6 miles (10 km) SE)
- Thousand Lake Mountain (11,305 feet (3,446 m), 17 miles (27 km) NNE)

=== Climate ===
According to the Köppen Climate Classification system, Bicknell has a semi-arid climate, abbreviated "BSk" on climate maps.

== Demographics ==
Historical population
Census	Pop.	Note	%±
1940	362		—
1950	373		3.0%
1960	366		−1.9%
1970	264		−27.9%
1980	296		12.1%
1990	327		10.5%
2000	353		8.0%
2010	327		−7.4%
2020	323		−1.2%
U.S. Decennial Census

As of the census of 2000, there were 353 people, 126 households, and 95 families residing in the town. The population density was 757.9 people per square mile (290.0/km^{2}). There were 143 housing units at an average density of 307.0 per square mile (117.5/km^{2}). The racial makeup of the town was 97.17% White, 0.28% Native American, 1.98% from other races, and 0.57% from two or more races. Hispanic or Latino of any race were 3.12% of the population.

There were 126 households, out of which 38.1% had children under 18 living with them, 62.7% were married couples living together, 8.7% had a female householder with no husband present, and 24.6% were non-families. 21.4% of all households were made up of individuals, and 10.3% had someone living alone who was 65 years of age or older. The average household size was 2.80 and the average family size was 3.23.

In the town, the population was spread out, with 32.9% under 18, 9.3% from 18 to 24, 22.9% from 25 to 44, 17.6% from 45 to 64, and 17.3% who were 65 years of age or older. The median age was 30 years. For every 100 females, there were 101.7 males. For every 100 females aged 18 and over, there were 97.5 males.

The median income for a household in the town was $32,750, and the median income for a family was $34,500. Males had a median income of $29,750 versus $20,750 for females. The per capita income for the town was $13,457. About 12.5% of families and 11.7% of the population were below the poverty line, including 13.6% of those under age 18 and 7.2% of those aged 65 or over.

== See also ==
- List of cities and towns in Utah
