= Bloody Hands Gap =

Mountain pass in Utah

Coordinates: 38°10′5.9″N 111°1′57.6″W

Bloody Hands Gap [el. 5,092 ft (1,552 m)] is a mountain pass in Wayne County, Utah.

Bloody Hands Gap was named for a set of handprints painted in red on a rock wall.
