= Cassidy Arch =

Natural rock arch in Utah, US

- Rock arch
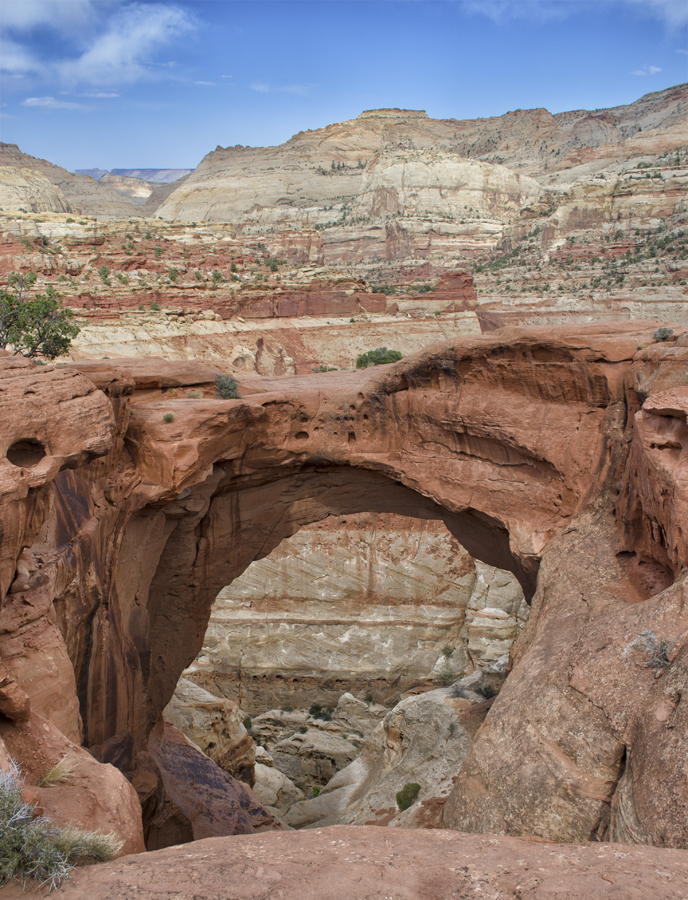
- View of the arch

- Location in Utah Location in Utah
- Coordinates: 38°15′43″N 111°13′32″W
- Location: Capitol Reef National Park, Utah

Dimensions
  - Height: 400 ft (120 m)
- Elevation: 5,912 ft (1,802 m)

Cassidy Arch is a large natural arch located in Capitol Reef National Park, Utah. The formation is described as "scenic" and "spectacular" on the official Utah travel website. The arch sits 400 feet (120 m) above the Scenic Drive and the Grand Wash Trail.

== Name ==
Cassidy Arch is named after local railroad bandit Butch Cassidy, who reportedly had a hideout in nearby Grand Wash Canyon while on the run.

== Access ==
The arch can be accessed via the Grand Wash Trail, then later joining onto the Cassidy Arch Trail, a 3.5 miles (5.6 km) loop trail near Torrey. Due to a 700-foot (210 m) elevation gain in under 2 miles (3.2 km) and steep terrain winding through the canyon, the trail is generally considered a challenging route. Grand Wash Road, which is the road that leads to the trailhead, is a rocky, unpaved dirt road and is prone to flash floods. The arch is one of the few standable arches in the National Park system
