= Caineville, Utah =

Unincorporated community in the state of Utah, United States

- Unincorporated community
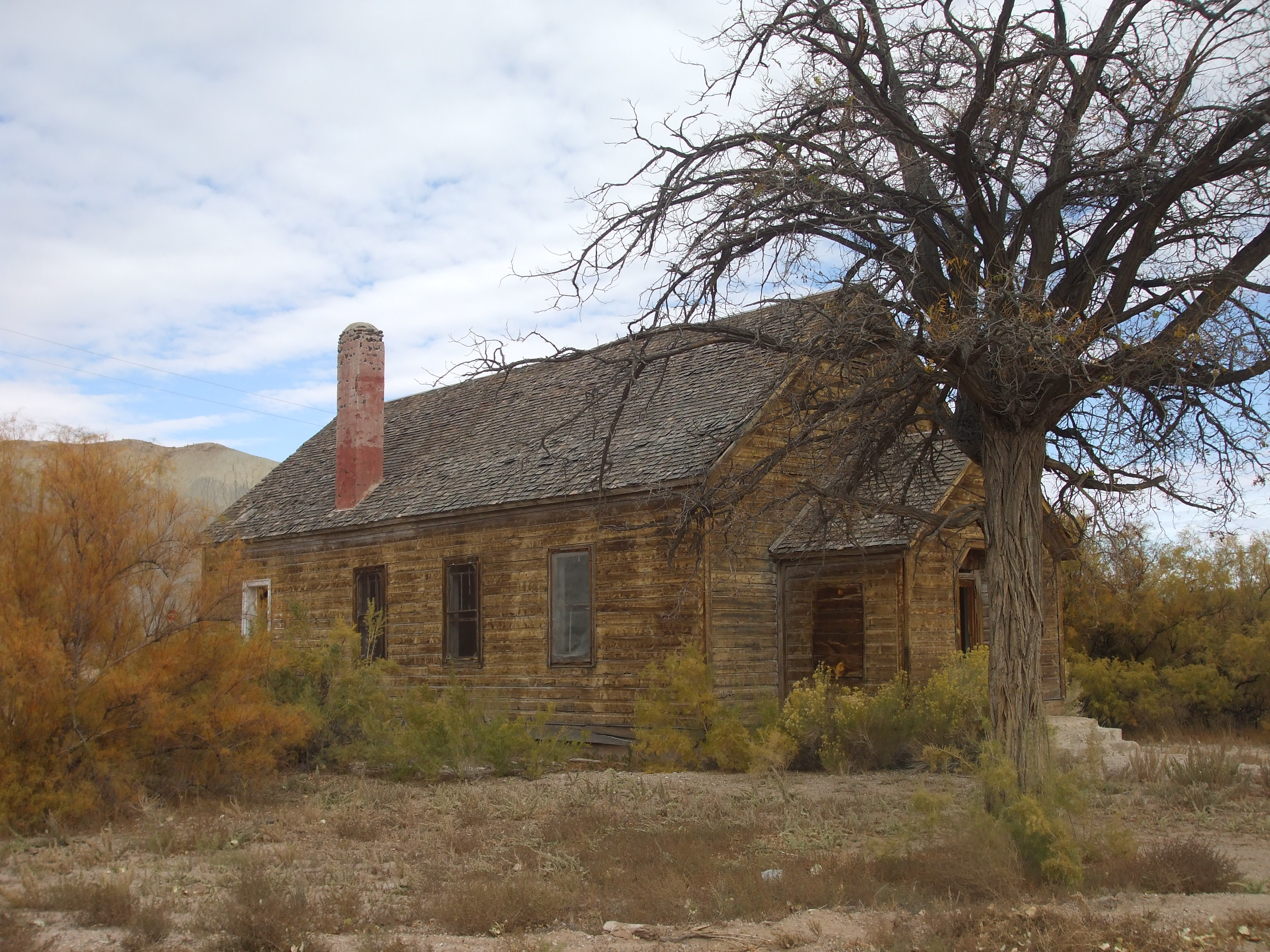
- Abandoned former church/schoolhouse

- Location within Utah Location within the United States
- Coordinates: 38°19′59″N 111°01′08″W
- Country: United States
- State: Utah
- County: Wayne
- Settled: 1882
- Founder: Elijah Cutler Behunin
- Named for: John T. Caine
- Elevation: 4,600 ft (1,400 m)
- Time zone: UTC-7 (Mountain (MST))
  - Summer (DST): UTC-6 (MDT)
- ZIP code: 84775
- Area code: 435
- GNIS feature ID: 1426269

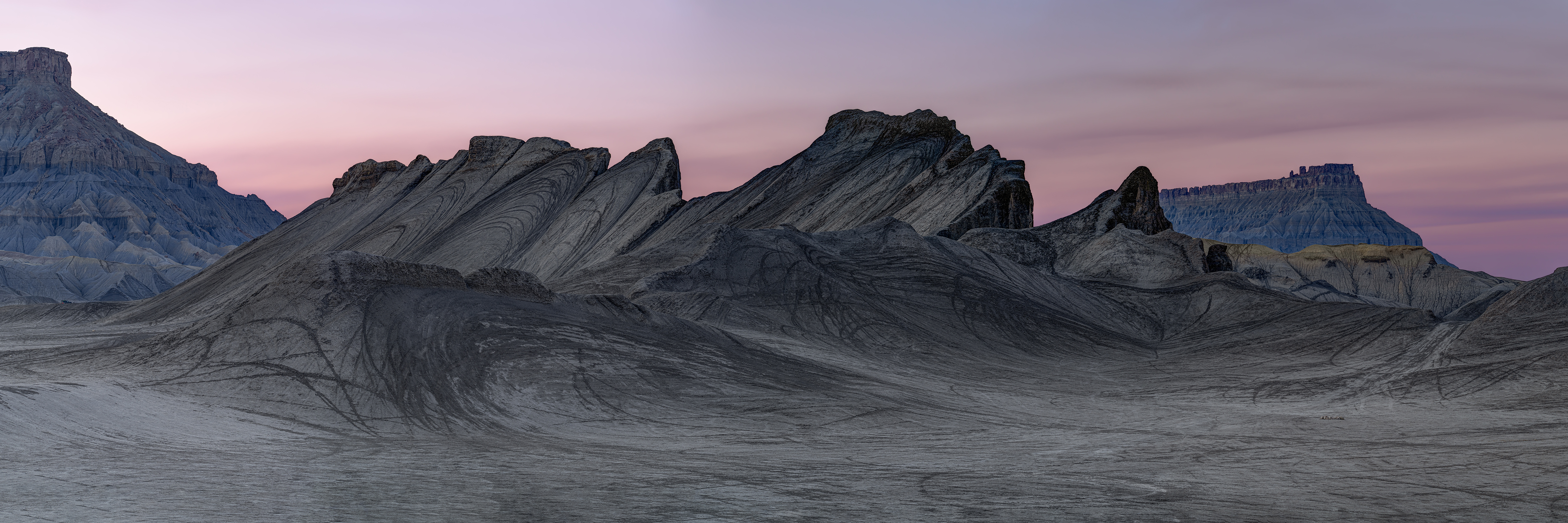
Castle at Swing Arm City at twilight. Smoke from forest fire in the sky.

Caineville is an unincorporated community in central Wayne County, Utah, United States.

The community is located east of Capitol Reef National Park and west of Hanksville, along the Fremont River and Utah State Route 24. The settlement was named after John T. Caine and was founded by Elijah Cutler Behunin, whom the LDS Church sent there in 1882 to open the area for settlement.

Swing Arm City is a 2,600-acre off-highway vehicle area near Caineville.

== Demographics ==
Historical population
Census	Pop.	Note	%±
1900	131		—
1910	38		−71.0%
1920	67		76.3%
1930	71		6.0%
1940	68		−4.2%
1950	20		−70.6%
Source: U.S. Census Bureau
