= Wayne County, Utah =

County in Utah, United States

- County
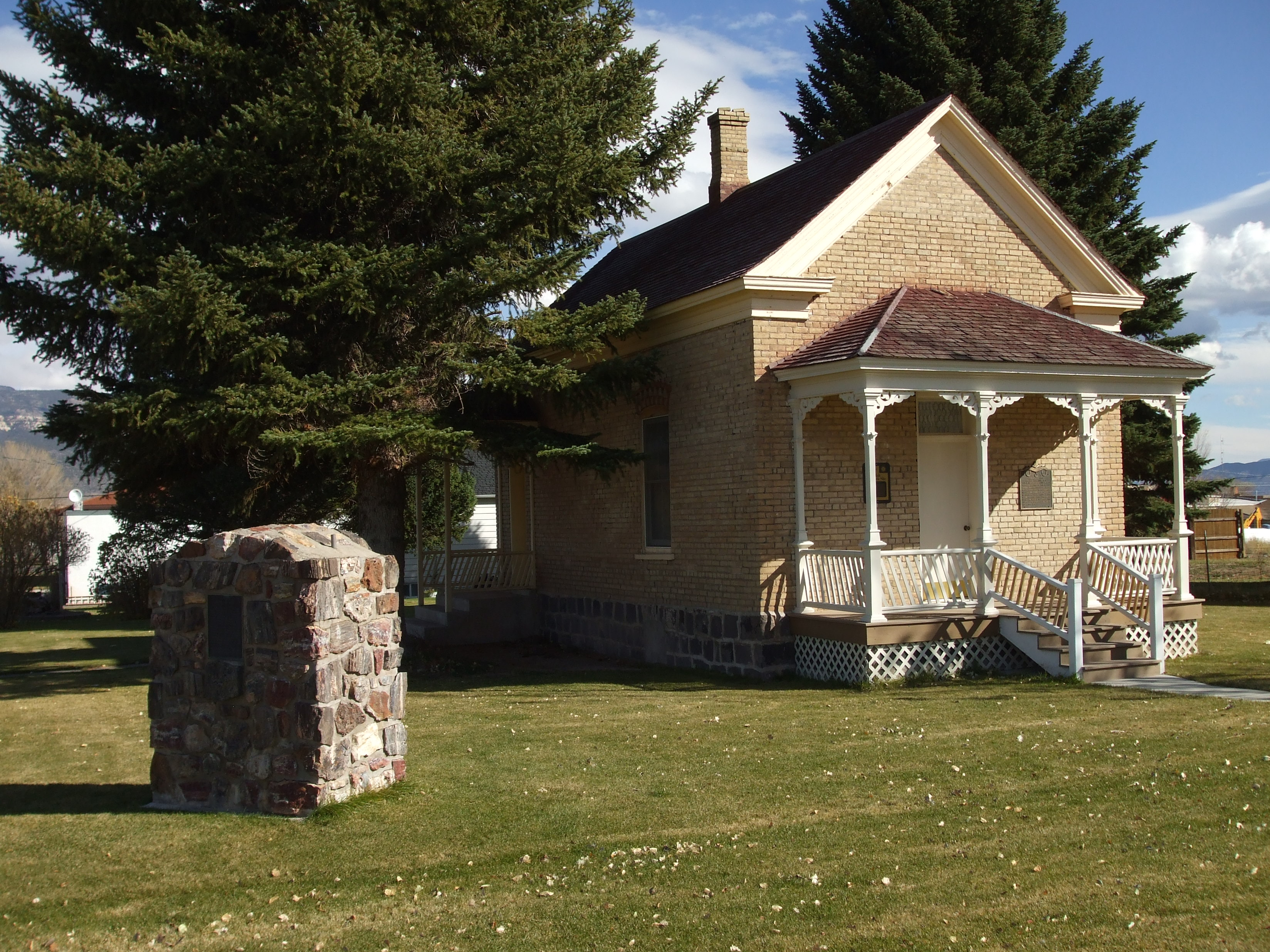
- Tithing Office in Loa, Utah.

- Location within the U.S. state of Utah
- Coordinates: 38°22′N 110°54′W
- Country: United States
- State: Utah
- Founded: March 10, 1892
- Named for: Wayne County, Tennessee
- Seat: Loa
- Largest town: Loa

Area
  - Total: 2,466 sq mi (6,390 km^{2})
  - Land: 2,461 sq mi (6,370 km^{2})
  - Water: 5.8 sq mi (15 km^{2}) 0.2%

Population (2020)
  - Total: 2,486
  - Estimate (2025): 2,587 ▲
  - Density: 1.010/sq mi (0.3900/km^{2})
- Time zone: UTC−7 (Mountain)
  - Summer (DST): UTC−6 (MDT)
- Congressional district: 2nd
- Website: waynecountyutah.gov

Wayne County is a county in the U.S. state of Utah. As of the 2020 United States census, the population was 2,486, making it the third-least populous county in Utah. Its county seat is Loa.

== History ==
Due to its remoteness and harsh terrain, settlements did not appear in the future Wayne County until the 1880s. By 1892, there was enough settlement and enough interest in a separate county (due mainly to the difficulty of accessing the Piute County seat), that Utah Territory passed an act (effective date March 10, 1892) to separate the east portion of Piute into a separate county. The county was named for Wayne County, Tennessee, itself named for Anthony Wayne. The county boundaries have remained unchanged since its creation.

== Geography ==
The eastern border of Wayne County is delineated by the meanders of the Green River, which flows southward to discharge into the Colorado River. After the two rivers join, the combined southwestern flow forms the remaining portion of the county's eastern border. The central part of the county is drained by the Fremont River and Muddy Creek. The Fremont begins at Fish Lake in Sevier County and flows into Wayne County near its northwestern corner. It joins the Muddy near Hanksville to form the Dirty Devil River, which flows southeastward out of the county's southern border to discharge into Colorado. Wayne County terrain varies from rough forestland on the west to arid poor soil carved by drainages and rocky outcrops. The terrain slopes to the east and south; its highest point is Bluebell Knoll on Boulder Mountain at 11,317 ft (3,449 m) ASL The county has a total area of 2,466 square miles (6,390 km^{2}), of which 2,461 square miles (6,370 km^{2}) is land and 5.8 square miles (15 km^{2}) (0.2%) is water.

The Green River, passing through the canyons of Canyonlands National Park, forms the eastern boundary. The San Rafael Desert occupies the center of the county. Thousand Lake Mountain and Boulder Mountain flank Rabbit Valley on the western end of the county, where forests contrast with the deserts to the east. The small population of the county is centered in Rabbit Valley, with one town of 200, Hanksville, located in Graves Valley north of the Henry Mountains. Wayne County is also home to Capitol Reef National Park.

=== Major highways ===
- SR-12
- SR-24
- SR-72
- SR-95

=== Adjacent counties ===
- Emery County - north
- Grand County - northeast
- San Juan County - east
- Garfield County - south
- Piute County - west
- Sevier County (northwest)

=== National forests/parks ===
- Canyonlands National Park
- Capitol Reef National Park
- Dixie National Forest
- Fishlake National Forest
- Glen Canyon National Recreation Area

=== Lakes ===
- Abes Knoll Reservoir
- Alkali Lake
- Bald Knoll Reservoir
- Beaver Dam Reservoir
- Beef Hollow Reservoir
- Bicknell Reservoir
- Big Hollow Reservoir
- Black Point Reservoir
- Blackburn Reservoir
- Blind Lake (near Neff Reservoir)
- Blind Lake (near Pear Lake)
- Blue Lake
- Bobs Hole
- Brinkerhoff Pond
- Buffalo Pond
- Bull Roost Reservoir
- Bullberry Lakes
- Cameron Reservoir
- Cedar Peak Lake
- Coleman Reservoir
- Cook Lake
- Cub Lake
- Curler Lake
- Cyclone Co-op Reservoir
- Cyclone Knoll Reservoir
- Dead Horse Lake
- Deadman Hollow Reservoir
- Deep Creek Lake
- Donkey Reservoir
- Dry Lake Reservoir
- East Bicknell Sand Wash Pond
- East Gate Reservoir
- Eightmile Reservoir
- Emily Lake
- Evans Reservoir
- Fish Creek Reservoir
- Flat Top Reservoir
- Flatiron Lakes
- Flossie Lake
- Government Lake
- Grass Lake (near Bobs Hole)
- Grass Lake (near Torgerson Lake)
- Green Lake
- Gripe Reservoir
- Hare Lake
- Heart Lake
- Honeymoon Lake
- Hunt Reservoir
- Jakes Knoll Reservoir
- Jane Lake
- Jay Pond
- Jim Larson Reservoir
- Lava Lake
- Lee Lake
- Left Hand Reservoir
- Lightning Lake
- Long Hollow Reservoir
- Lost Lake
- Lower Balsam Reservoir
- Lower Reservoir
- Meadow Gulch Reservoir
- Middle Balsam Reservoir
- Middle Reservoir
- Mill Meadow Reservoir (part)
- Miller Lake
- Mitts Reservoir
- Moroni Reservoir
- Mud Lake
- Ned Reservoir
- Neff Reservoir
- Ottos Reservoir
- Parker Hollow Reservoir
- Pass Reservoir
- Pear Lake
- Petes Pond
- Pine Creek Reservoir
- Pole Canyon Reservoir
- Raft Lake
- Right Fork Wildcat Reservoir
- Rock Lake
- Rock Point Reservoir
- Round Lake (near Heart Lake)
- Round Lake (near Lower Reservoir)
- Sage Reservoir
- Smooth Knoll Reservoir
- Snow Lake
- Snow Lakes
- Solitaire Lake
- Spray Reservoir
- Square Reservoir
- Tidwell Reservoir
- Torgerson Lake
- Twin Lakes
- Upper Balsam Reservoir
- Vance Reservoir
- West Bicknell Pond
- West Flat Top Reservoir Number 1
- West Flat Top Reservoir Number 2
- White Rock Reservoir
- Wide Hollow Reservoir
- Wildcat Reservoir
- Woodys Reservoir
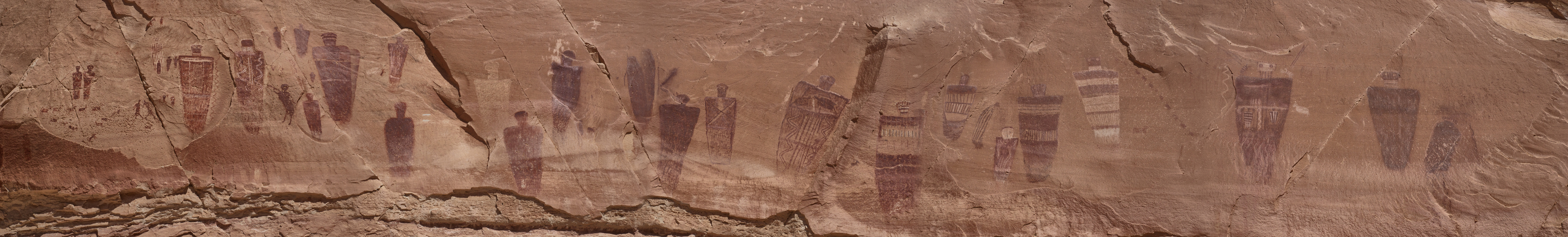
Panorama of the Great Gallery in Canyonlands National Park

== Demographics ==
Historical population
Census	Pop.	Note	%±
1900	1,907		—
1910	1,749		−8.3%
1920	2,097		19.9%
1930	2,067		−1.4%
1940	2,394		15.8%
1950	2,205		−7.9%
1960	1,728		−21.6%
1970	1,483		−14.2%
1980	1,911		28.9%
1990	2,177		13.9%
2000	2,509		15.3%
2010	2,778		10.7%
2020	2,486		−10.5%
2025 (est.)	2,587	▲	4.1%
US Decennial Census; 1790–1960 1900–1990; 1990–2000 2010 2020

=== 2020 census ===
According to the 2020 United States census and 2020 American Community Survey, there were 2,486 people in Wayne County with a population density of 1.0 people per square mile (0.4/km^{2}). Among non-Hispanic or Latino people, the racial makeup was 2,267 (91.2%) White, 1 (0.0%) African American, 19 (0.8%) Native American, 16 (0.6%) Asian, 3 (0.1%) Pacific Islander, 5 (0.2%) from other races, and 79 (3.2%) from two or more races. 96 (3.9%) people were Hispanic or Latino.

Wayne County, Utah – Racial and ethnic composition Note: the US Census treats Hispanic/Latino as an ethnic category. This table excludes Latinos from the racial categories and assigns them to a separate category. Hispanics/Latinos may be of any race.
Race / Ethnicity (NH = Non-Hispanic)	Pop 2000	Pop 2010	Pop 2020	% 2000	% 2010	% 2020
White alone (NH)	2,409	2,596	2,267	96.01%	93.45%	91.19%
Black or African American alone (NH)	4	2	1	0.16%	0.07%	0.04%
Native American or Alaska Native alone (NH)	9	8	19	0.36%	0.29%	0.76%
Asian alone (NH)	2	19	16	0.08%	0.68%	0.64%
Pacific Islander alone (NH)	4	4	3	0.16%	0.14%	0.12%
Other race alone (NH)	15	0	5	0.60%	0.00%	0.20%
Mixed race or Multiracial (NH)	16	33	79	0.64%	1.19%	3.18%
Hispanic or Latino (any race)	50	116	96	1.99%	4.18%	3.86%
Total	2,509	2,778	2,486	100.00%	100.00%	100.00%

There were 1,239 (49.84%) males and 1,247 (50.16%) females, and the population distribution by age was 536 (21.6%) under the age of 18, 1,334 (53.7%) from 18 to 64, and 616 (24.8%) who were at least 65 years old. The median age was 47.3 years.

There were 1,064 households in Wayne County with an average size of 2.34 of which 711 (66.8%) were families and 353 (33.2%) were non-families. Among all families, 601 (56.5%) were married couples, 49 (4.6%) were male householders with no spouse, and 61 (5.7%) were female householders with no spouse. Among all non-families, 307 (28.9%) were a single person living alone and 46 (4.3%) were two or more people living together. 290 (27.3%) of all households had children under the age of 18. 814 (76.5%) of households were owner-occupied while 250 (23.5%) were renter-occupied.

The median income for a Wayne County household was $49,299 and the median family income was $62,069, with a per-capita income of $23,184. The median income for males that were full-time employees was $50,625 and for females $34,653. 10.1% of the population and 6.8% of families were below the poverty line.

In terms of education attainment, out of the 1,822 people in Wayne County 25 years or older, 190 (10.4%) had not completed high school, 346 (19.0%) had a high school diploma or equivalency, 848 (46.5%) had some college or associate degree, 374 (20.5%) had a bachelor's degree, and 64 (3.5%) had a graduate or professional degree.

=== Ancestry and ethnicity ===
As of 2017 the largest self-identified ancestry groups/ethnic groups in Wayne County, Utah were:

Largest ancestries (2017)	Percent
English	45.5%
German	16.3%
Dutch	8.4%
Danish	7.6%
Irish	5.8%
Scottish	5.4%
Swedish	3.9%
American	2.3%
Welsh	1.7%
Polish	1.2%

== Communities ==
=== Towns ===
- Bicknell
- Hanksville
- Loa (county seat)
- Lyman
- Torrey

=== Census-designated places ===
- Fremont
- Teasdale

=== Unincorporated communities ===
- Caineville
- Fruita
- Grover
- Notom

=== Former communities ===
- Aldridge
- Eagle City
- Giles

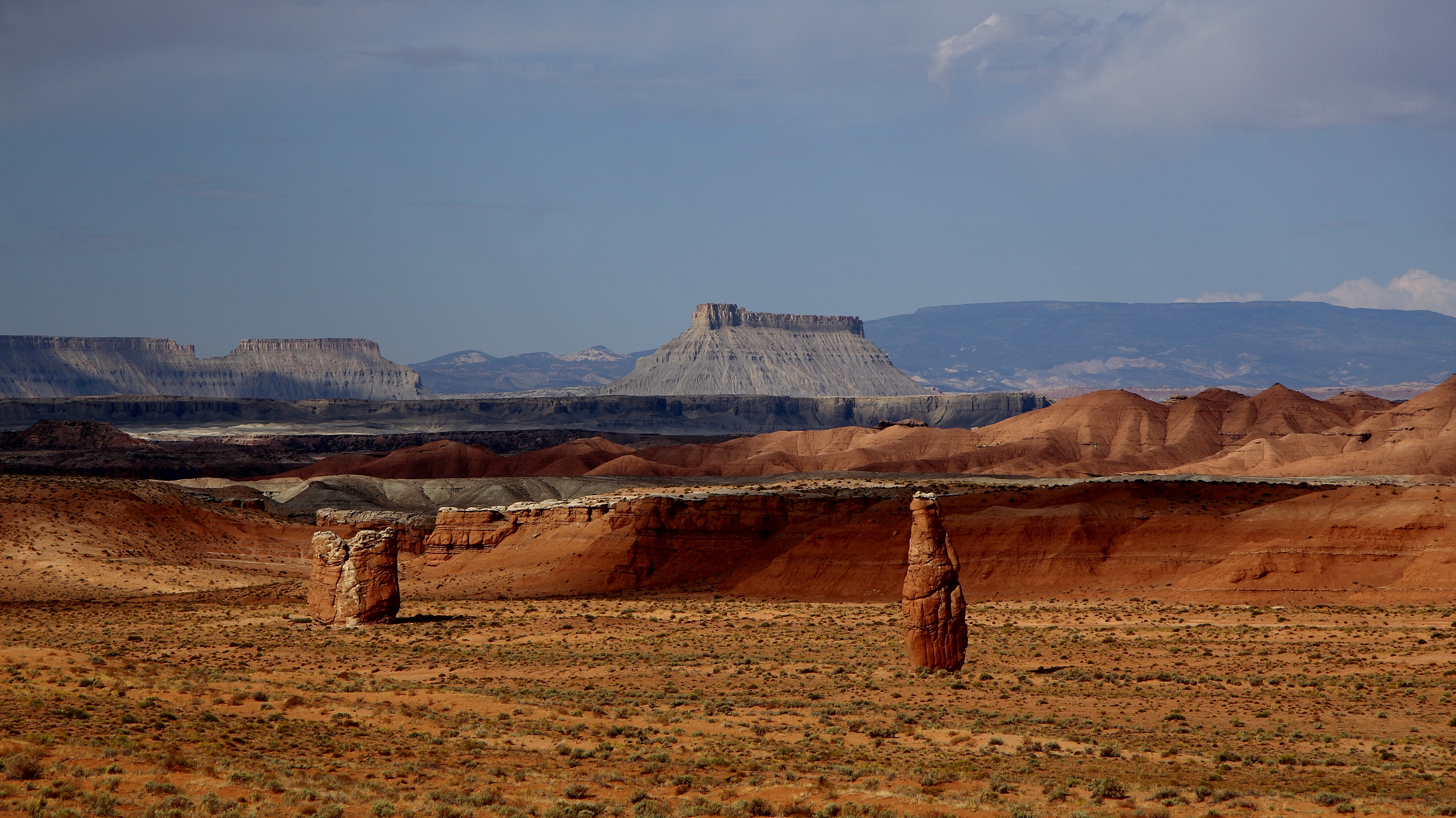
View north of Hanksville from Route 24. Factory Butte in background.

== Politics and government ==
Wayne County voters are traditionally Republican. In only one national election since 1948 has the county selected the Democratic Party candidate (as of 2024).

State elected offices
Position	District	Name	Affiliation	First elected
Senate	24	Derrin Owens	Republican	2020
House of Representatives	73	Phil Lyman	Republican	2018
Board of Education	14	Mark Huntsman	Nonpartisan	2014

United States presidential election results for Wayne County, Utah
Year	Republican		Democratic		Third party(ies)	
Year	No.	%	No.	%	No.	%
1896	78	16.15%	405	83.85%	0	0.00%
1900	324	52.94%	282	46.08%	6	0.98%
1904	310	53.26%	251	43.13%	21	3.61%
1908	279	49.91%	184	32.92%	96	17.17%
1912	282	52.03%	183	33.76%	77	14.21%
1916	225	35.89%	393	62.68%	9	1.44%
1920	396	61.97%	224	35.05%	19	2.97%
1924	331	57.27%	241	41.70%	6	1.04%
1928	422	68.17%	195	31.50%	2	0.32%
1932	398	49.26%	401	49.63%	9	1.11%
1936	329	38.52%	522	61.12%	3	0.35%
1940	380	43.13%	500	56.75%	1	0.11%
1944	325	43.05%	430	56.95%	0	0.00%
1948	367	44.16%	460	55.35%	4	0.48%
1952	536	66.09%	275	33.91%	0	0.00%
1956	499	63.81%	283	36.19%	0	0.00%
1960	446	53.86%	382	46.14%	0	0.00%
1964	400	49.26%	412	50.74%	0	0.00%
1968	511	62.85%	248	30.50%	54	6.64%
1972	597	71.75%	183	22.00%	52	6.25%
1976	555	59.11%	334	35.57%	50	5.32%
1980	835	76.05%	226	20.58%	37	3.37%
1984	930	80.24%	224	19.33%	5	0.43%
1988	784	68.59%	353	30.88%	6	0.52%
1992	706	57.63%	236	19.27%	283	23.10%
1996	741	64.89%	265	23.20%	136	11.91%
2000	953	77.80%	202	16.49%	70	5.71%
2004	1,062	78.09%	279	20.51%	19	1.40%
2008	940	70.04%	335	24.96%	67	4.99%
2012	1,089	82.06%	215	16.20%	23	1.73%
2016	966	67.74%	271	19.00%	189	13.25%
2020	1,229	75.82%	365	22.52%	27	1.67%
2024	1,238	74.98%	381	23.08%	32	1.94%

== Education ==
There is one school district, Wayne School District.

== See also ==
- National Register of Historic Places listings in Wayne County, Utah
- For additional History of Wayne County Utah see "Utah's Stolen Treasures" by Gene Covington ISBN 978-1-62516-335-6 (e-book) or ISBN 978-1-61897-954-4 (paperback)
