= Fremont, Utah =

- Census-designated place
- Location in Wayne County and the state of Utah.
- Coordinates: 38°27′28″N 111°36′51″W
- Country: United States
- State: Utah
- County: Wayne
- Settled: 1876
- Founder: William Wilson Morrell
- Named for: Fremont River

Area
  - Total: 1.7 sq mi (4.5 km^{2})
  - Land: 1.7 sq mi (4.5 km^{2})
  - Water: 0 sq mi (0.0 km^{2})
- Elevation: 7,218 ft (2,200 m)

Population (2020)
  - Total: 167
  - Density: 96/sq mi (37/km^{2})
- Time zone: UTC-7 (Mountain (MST))
  - Summer (DST): UTC-6 (MDT)
- ZIP code: 84747
- Area code: 435
- GNIS feature ID: 2629949

Fremont is a census-designated place in northwestern Wayne County, Utah, United States. It lies along State Route 72 just northeast of the town of Loa, the county seat of Wayne County. To the north is Fishlake National Forest. Fremont's elevation is 7,218 feet (2,200 m). The population was 167 at the 2020 census.

Fremont's first permanent settlers were the family of William Wilson Morrell in 1876. The community takes its name from the Fremont River.

== Demographics ==
Historical population
Census	Pop.	Note	%±
2010	145		—
2020	167		15.2%

As of the census of 2010, there were 145 people living in the CDP. There were 96 housing units. The racial makeup of the CDP was 97.9% White, 0.7% Asian, and 1.4% from two or more races. Hispanic or Latino of any race were 2.1% of the population.

== See also ==
- List of census-designated places in Utah
