= Teasdale, Utah =

- Census-designated place
- Location in Wayne County and the state of Utah.
- Coordinates: 38°17′04″N 111°28′23″W
- Country: United States
- State: Utah
- County: Wayne
- Settled: 1878
- Named for: George Teasdale

Area
  - Total: 4.0 sq mi (10.4 km^{2})
  - Land: 4.0 sq mi (10.4 km^{2})
  - Water: 0 sq mi (0 km^{2})
- Elevation: 7,103 ft (2,165 m)

Population (2020)
  - Total: 140
  - Density: 35/sq mi (13/km^{2})
- Time zone: UTC-7 (Mountain (MST))
  - Summer (DST): UTC-6 (MDT)
- ZIP code: 84773
- Area code: 435
- FIPS code: 49-75470
- GNIS feature ID: 2629955

Teasdale is a census-designated place in western Wayne County, Utah, United States, between the Dixie and Fishlake National Forests and near Capitol Reef National Park. The population was 140 at the 2020 census. Teasdale lies along local roads south of State Route 24, southeast of the town of Loa, the county seat of Wayne County. Teasdale has a post office with the ZIP code 84773.

== History ==
The town was founded by LDS settlers. They called it Bullberry Creek named after the creek adjacent to the town. In the early 1900s, the community was named for George Teasdale, a member of the Quorum of the Twelve Apostles of The Church of Jesus Christ of Latter-day Saints (LDS Church).

== Demographics ==
Historical population
Census	Pop.	Note	%±
2010	191		—
2020	140		−26.7%

As of the census of 2010, there were 191 people living in the CDP. There were 123 housing units. The racial makeup of the town was 95.3% White, 2.6% American Indian and Alaska Native, 1.0% Asian, 0.5% Native Hawaiian and Other Pacific Islander, and 0.5% from two or more races. Hispanic or Latino of any race were 1.6% of the population.

== Climate ==
According to the Köppen Climate Classification system, Teasdale has a semi-arid climate, abbreviated "BSk" on climate maps.

== See also ==
- List of census-designated places in Utah
