= Lyman, Utah =

Town in the state of Utah, United States

- Town
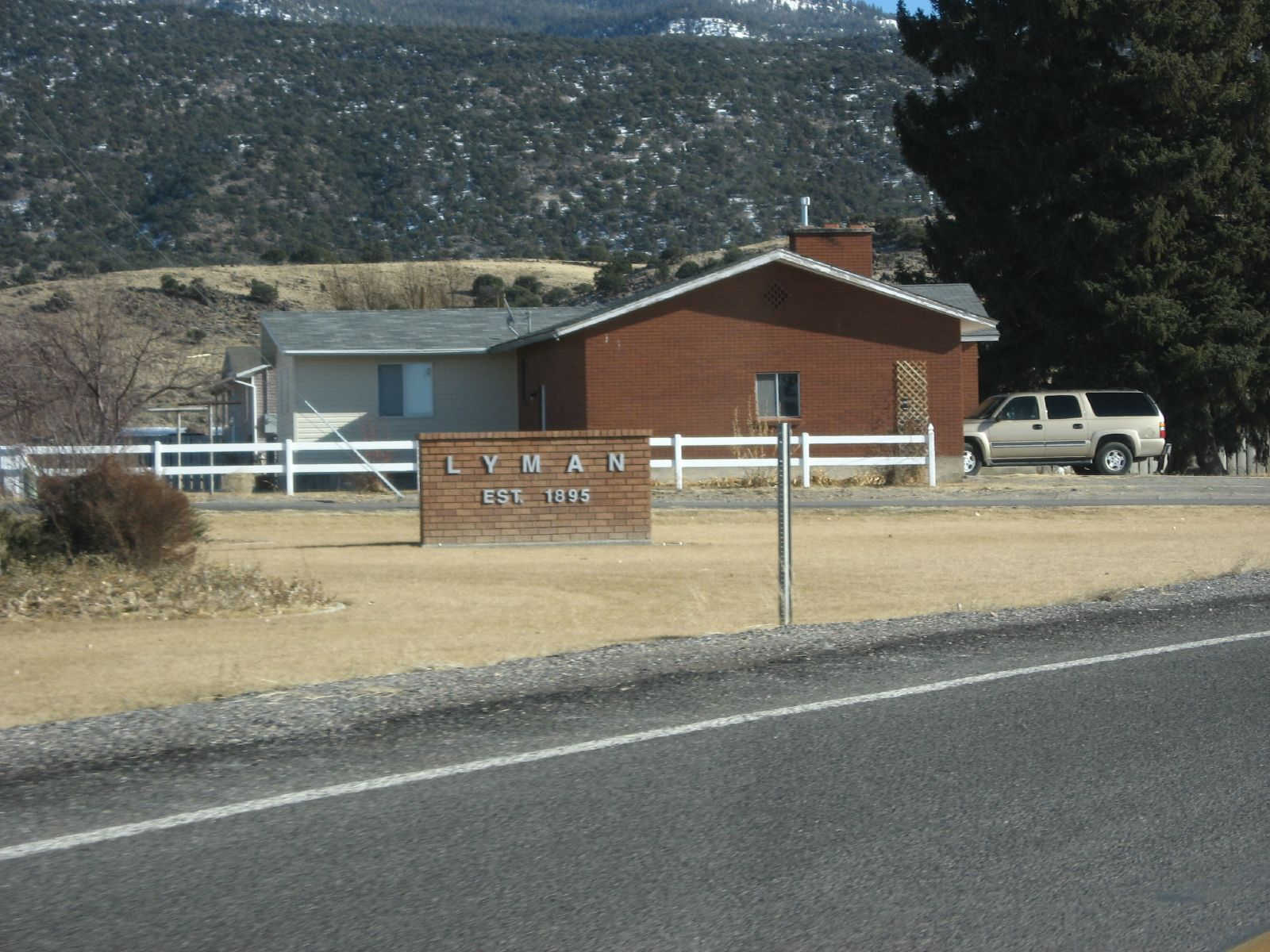
- City sign in Lyman, January 2008

- Location in Wayne County and the state of Utah.
- Coordinates: 38°23′46″N 111°35′20″W
- Country: United States
- State: Utah
- County: Wayne
- Named for: Francis M. Lyman

Area
  - Total: 1.81 sq mi (4.68 km^{2})
  - Land: 1.81 sq mi (4.68 km^{2})
  - Water: 0 sq mi (0.00 km^{2})
- Elevation: 7,182 ft (2,189 m)

Population (2020)
  - Total: 196
  - Density: 142.3/sq mi (54.93/km^{2})
- Time zone: UTC-7 (Mountain (MST))
  - Summer (DST): UTC-6 (MDT)
- ZIP code: 84749
- Area code: 435
- FIPS code: 49-46410
- GNIS feature ID: 1430020

Lyman is a town along State Route 24 in Wayne County, Utah, United States. The population was 196 at the 2020 census.

Lyman was originally known as East Loa. It became a distinct place from Loa in 1893.

== Geography ==
According to the United States Census Bureau, the town has a total area of 1.9 square miles (4.9 km^{2}), all land.

== Demographics ==
Historical population
Census	Pop.	Note	%±
1900	192		—
1910	187		−2.6%
1920	235		25.7%
1930	253		7.7%
1940	297		17.4%
1950	276		−7.1%
1980	184		—
1990	198		7.6%
2000	234		18.2%
2010	258		10.3%
2020	196		−24.0%
U.S. Decennial Census

As of the census of 2000, there were 234 people, 74 households, and 60 families residing in the town. The population density was 123.8 people per square mile (47.8/km^{2}). There were 93 housing units at an average density of 49.2 per square mile (19.0/km^{2}). The racial makeup of the town was 98.72% White, 0.43% African American, 0.43% Native American, and 0.43% from two or more races. Hispanic or Latino of any race were 1.28% of the population.

There were 74 households, out of which 43.2% had children under the age of 18 living with them, 74.3% were married couples living together, 4.1% had a female householder with no husband present, and 18.9% were non-families. 18.9% of all households were made up of individuals, and 10.8% had someone living alone who was 65 years of age or older. The average household size was 3.16 and the average family size was 3.67.

In the town, the population was spread out, with 38.9% under the age of 18, 6.4% from 18 to 24, 22.6% from 25 to 44, 21.4% from 45 to 64, and 10.7% who were 65 years of age or older. The median age was 29 years. For every 100 females, there were 105.3 males. For every 100 females age 18 and over, there were 110.3 males.

The median income for a household in the town was $36,607, and the median income for a family was $40,357. Males had a median income of $26,071 versus $20,938 for females. The per capita income for the town was $12,493. About 22.2% of families and 22.1% of the population were below the poverty line, including 32.7% of those under the age of eighteen and none of those 65 or over.

== See also ==
- List of cities and towns in Utah
