= Loa, Utah =

Town in the state of Utah, United States

- Town
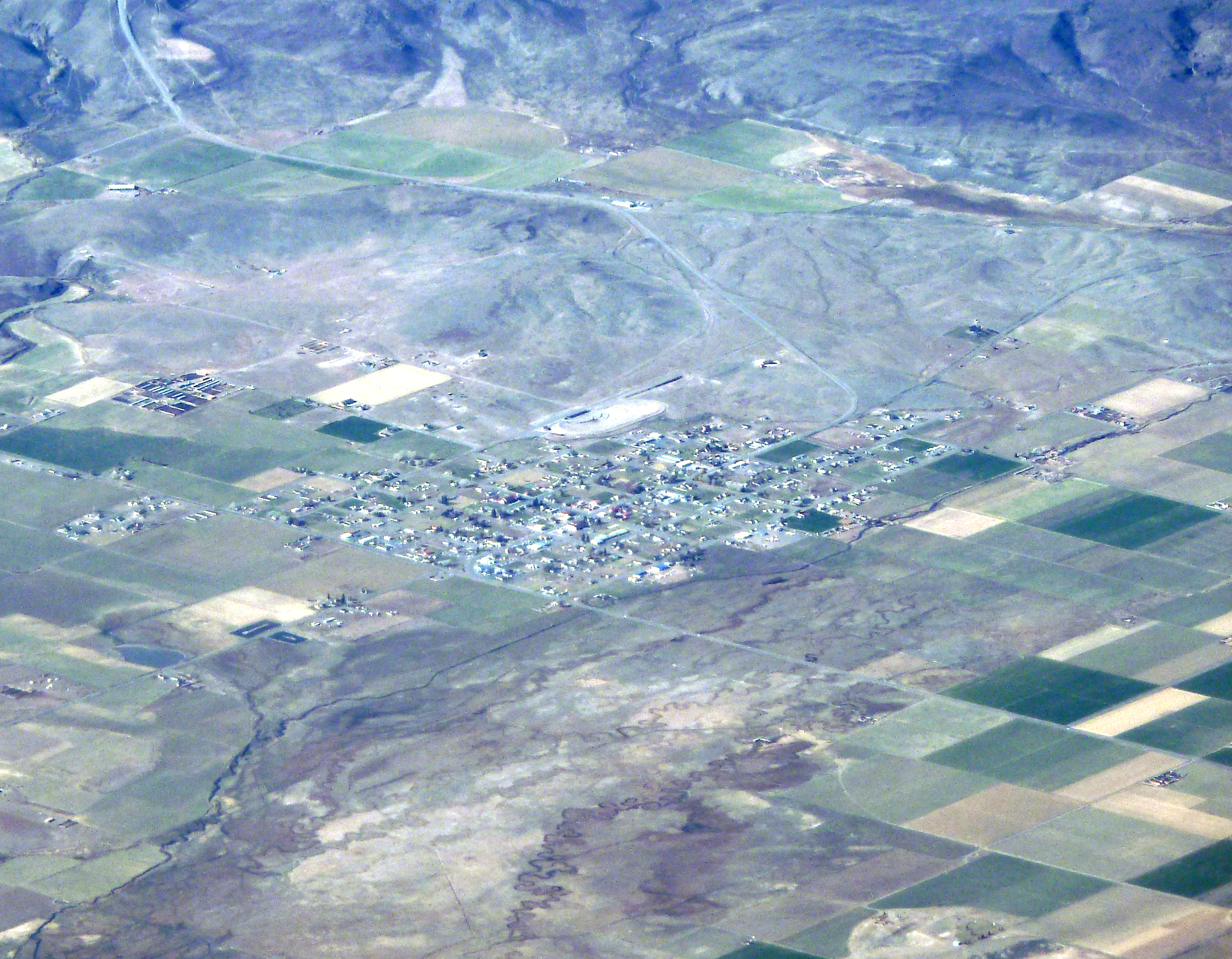
- Aerial view of Loa

- Location in Wayne County and the state of Utah.
- Coordinates: 38°24′10″N 111°38′38″W
- Country: United States
- State: Utah
- County: Wayne
- Settled: 1878
- Named for: Mauna Loa

Area
  - Total: 0.95 sq mi (2.46 km^{2})
  - Land: 0.95 sq mi (2.46 km^{2})
  - Water: 0 sq mi (0.00 km^{2})
- Elevation: 7,064 ft (2,153 m)

Population (2020)
  - Total: 516
  - Density: 605.3/sq mi (233.72/km^{2})
- Time zone: UTC−7 (Mountain (MST))
  - Summer (DST): UTC−6 (MDT)
- ZIP code: 84747
- Area code: 435
- FIPS code: 49-45530
- GNIS feature ID: 1442822
- Website: loautah.gov

Loa is a town in, and the county seat of, Wayne County, Utah, United States, along State Route 24. The population was 516 at the 2020 census.

== History ==
A post office called Loa has been in operation since 1879. The town was named after Mauna Loa, in Hawaii, by a Mormon missionary who had returned from that place.

== Geography and climate ==
According to the United States Census Bureau, the town has a total area of 0.9 square mile (2.3 km^{2}), which is all land.

Loa sits beside the only source of water known as Spring Creek, which rises 4 miles (6 km) to the north where today is located the state fish hatchery. The drinking water in Loa comes from a spring near Road Creek.

Loa features a cold semi-arid climate (Köppen BSk).

Climate data for Loa, Utah, 1991–2020 normals, extremes 1893–present: 7070ft (2155m)
Month	Jan	Feb	Mar	Apr	May	Jun	Jul	Aug	Sep	Oct	Nov	Dec	Year
Record high °F (°C)	65 (18)	70 (21)	85 (29)	81 (27)	92 (33)	98 (37)	101 (38)	100 (38)	93 (34)	84 (29)	75 (24)	67 (19)	101 (38)
Mean maximum °F (°C)	51.6 (10.9)	55.6 (13.1)	64.4 (18.0)	73.2 (22.9)	80.1 (26.7)	88.6 (31.4)	90.1 (32.3)	88.2 (31.2)	83.9 (28.8)	75.8 (24.3)	65.7 (18.7)	54.3 (12.4)	91.2 (32.9)
Mean daily maximum °F (°C)	39.6 (4.2)	42.6 (5.9)	51.2 (10.7)	58.0 (14.4)	67.3 (19.6)	78.3 (25.7)	83.5 (28.6)	81.3 (27.4)	74.7 (23.7)	62.7 (17.1)	50.3 (10.2)	39.7 (4.3)	60.8 (16.0)
Daily mean °F (°C)	24.6 (−4.1)	28.1 (−2.2)	35.8 (2.1)	42.1 (5.6)	51.1 (10.6)	60.5 (15.8)	66.9 (19.4)	64.7 (18.2)	56.8 (13.8)	44.9 (7.2)	33.9 (1.1)	24.5 (−4.2)	44.5 (6.9)
Mean daily minimum °F (°C)	9.5 (−12.5)	13.7 (−10.2)	20.4 (−6.4)	26.2 (−3.2)	34.8 (1.6)	42.7 (5.9)	50.2 (10.1)	48.2 (9.0)	38.8 (3.8)	27.2 (−2.7)	17.6 (−8.0)	9.3 (−12.6)	28.2 (−2.1)
Mean minimum °F (°C)	−7.0 (−21.7)	−2.8 (−19.3)	6.9 (−13.9)	14.3 (−9.8)	23.2 (−4.9)	32.2 (0.1)	41.4 (5.2)	39.7 (4.3)	27.3 (−2.6)	14.3 (−9.8)	2.3 (−16.5)	−6.2 (−21.2)	−10.3 (−23.5)
Record low °F (°C)	−33 (−36)	−37 (−38)	−15 (−26)	−3 (−19)	10 (−12)	19 (−7)	19 (−7)	23 (−5)	10 (−12)	−9 (−23)	−18 (−28)	−28 (−33)	−37 (−38)
Average precipitation inches (mm)	0.39 (9.9)	0.45 (11)	0.51 (13)	0.50 (13)	0.75 (19)	0.57 (14)	1.34 (34)	1.37 (35)	0.98 (25)	0.84 (21)	0.29 (7.4)	0.42 (11)	8.41 (213.3)
Average snowfall inches (cm)	3.9 (9.9)	5.4 (14)	2.2 (5.6)	0.7 (1.8)	0.5 (1.3)	0.0 (0.0)	0.0 (0.0)	0.0 (0.0)	0.0 (0.0)	0.4 (1.0)	1.5 (3.8)	4.6 (12)	19.2 (49.4)
Average precipitation days (≥ 0.01 in)	4.0	3.7	3.6	3.2	5.6	2.4	7.1	8.6	5.0	4.8	2.5	3.8	54.3
Average snowy days (≥ 0.1 in)	2.4	2.2	1.4	0.6	0.2	0.0	0.0	0.0	0.0	0.3	1.1	3.0	11.2
Source 1: NOAA
Source 2: XMACIS2 (records & monthly max/mins)

== Demographics ==
Historical population
Census	Pop.	Note	%±
1890	411		—
1900	443		7.8%
1910	448		1.1%
1920	499		11.4%
1930	343		−31.3%
1940	396		15.5%
1950	437		10.4%
1960	359		−17.8%
1970	324		−9.7%
1980	364		12.3%
1990	444		22.0%
2000	525		18.2%
2010	572		9.0%
2020	516		−9.8%
U.S. Decennial Census

As of the census of 2000, there were 525 people, 165 households, and 134 families residing in the town. The population density was 595.5 people per square mile (230.3/km^{2}). There were 203 housing units at an average density of 230.3 per square mile (89.1/km^{2}). The racial makeup of the town was 99.24% White, 0.38% Native American and 0.38% Pacific Islander. Hispanic or Latino of any race were 1.71% of the population.

There were 165 households, out of which 46.1% had children under the age of 18 living with them, 74.5% were married couples living together, 3.6% had a female householder with no husband present, and 18.2% were non-families. 16.4% of all households were made up of single individuals and 10.3% had someone living alone who was 65 years of age or older. The average household size was 3.14 and the average family size was 3.56.

In the town, the population was spread out, with 37.0% under the age of 18, 10.1% from 18 to 24, 21.0% from 25 to 44, 18.3% from 45 to 64, and 13.7% who were 65 years of age or older. The median age was 28 years. For every 100 females, there were 99.6 males. For every 100 females age 18 and over, there were 97.0 males.

The median income for a household in the town was $33,750, and the median income for a family was $35,341. Males had a median income of $25,357 versus $21,250 for females. The per capita income for the town was $18,842. About 8.5% of families and 11.7% of the population were below the poverty line, including 13.9% of those under age 18 and 8.6% of those age 65 or over.

== Gallery ==
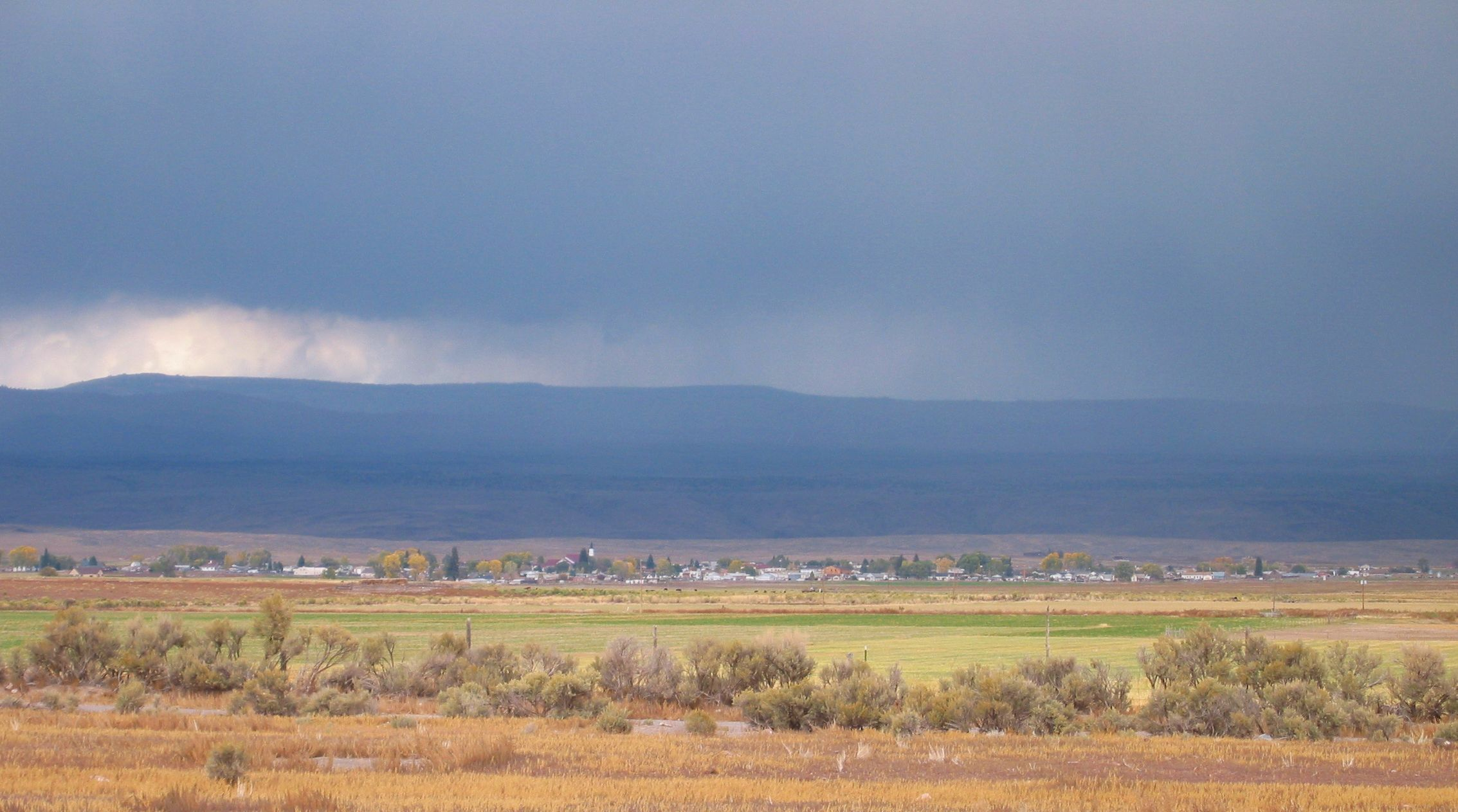
Rain over Loa

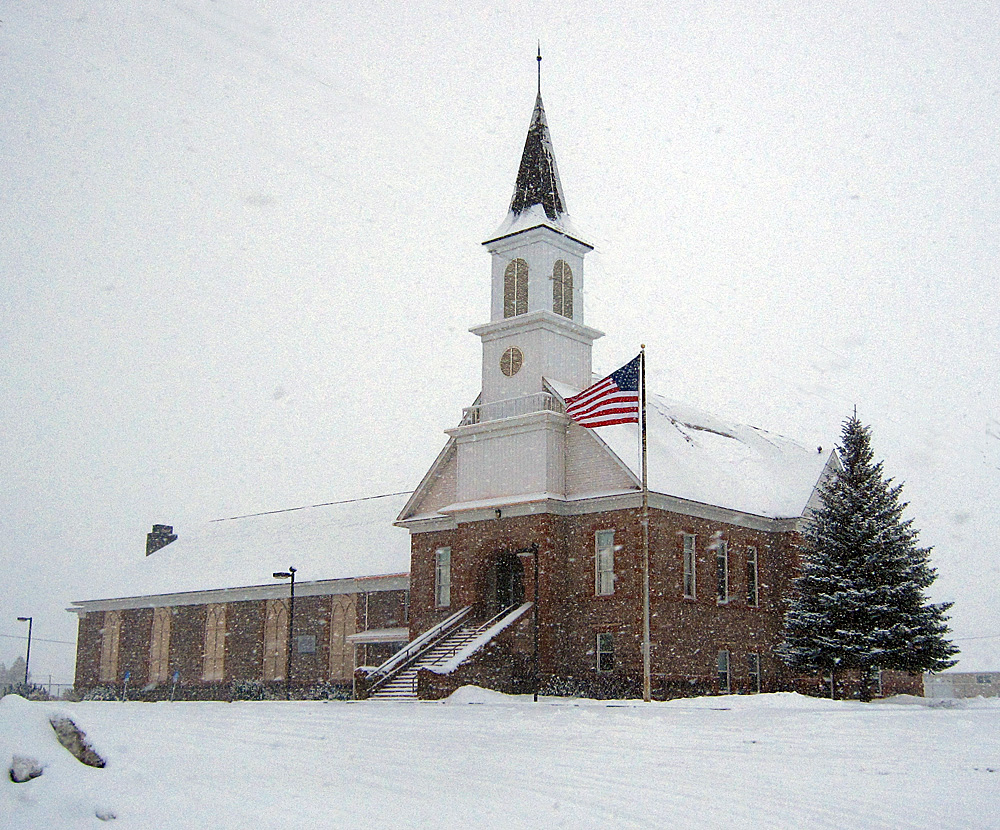
LDS church in Loa
