= National Register of Historic Places listings in Capitol Reef National Park =

This is a list of the National Register of Historic Places listings in Capitol Reef National Park.

This is intended to be a complete list of the properties and districts on the National Register of Historic Places in Capitol Reef National Park, Utah, United States. The locations of National Register properties and districts for which the latitude and longitude coordinates are included below, may be seen in a Google map.

There are ten properties and districts listed on the National Register in the park.

This National Park Service list is complete through NPS recent listings posted June 26, 2026.

== Current listings ==
	Name on the Register	Image	Date listed	Location	City or town	Description
1	Elijah Cutler Behunin Cabin	Elijah Cutler Behunin Cabin	September 13, 1999 (#99001094)	State Route 24, 1.5 miles southeast of the tip of Horse Mesa; 38°16′56″N 111°10′12″W	Torrey vicinity	
2	Cathedral Valley Corral	Cathedral Valley Corral	September 13, 1999 (#99001093)	Middle Desert, southeast of the confluence of Cathedral Mountain and Cathedral Valley; 38°29′05″N 111°20′58″W	Torrey vicinity	
3	Civilian Conservation Corps Powder Magazine	Civilian Conservation Corps Powder Magazine	September 13, 1999 (#99001090)	South of the Fremont River, north of Cuts Canyon; 38°16′33″N 111°15′04″W	Torrey vicinity	
4	Fruita Rural Historic District	Fruita Rural Historic District	March 25, 1997 (#97000246)	Roughly along State Route 24 from Sulphur Creek to Hickman Natural Bridge; 38°17′06″N 111°15′07″W	Fruita	
5	Fruita Schoolhouse	Fruita Schoolhouse	February 23, 1972 (#72000098)	Capitol Reef National Park on State Route 24; 38°17′15″N 111°14′45″W	Fruita	
6	Hanks' Dugouts	Hanks' Dugouts	September 13, 1999 (#99001095)	Confluence of Pleasant Creek and South Draw; 38°10′39″N 111°11′03″W	Torrey vicinity	
7	Lesley Morrell Line Cabin and Corral	Lesley Morrell Line Cabin and Corral	September 13, 1999 (#99001096)	Confluence of Middle Desert Wash and Cathedral Valley; 38°29′02″N 111°21′55″W	Torrey vicinity	
8	Oak Creek Dam		September 13, 1999 (#99001091)	Oak Creek, north of North Coleman Canyon; 38°05′00″N 111°08′15″W	Torrey vicinity	
9	Oyler Mine	Oyler Mine	September 14, 1999 (#99001092)	Confluence of Grand Wash and Cohab Canyon; 38°15′33″N 111°13′51″W	Torrey Vicinity	
10	Pioneer Register	Pioneer Register	September 13, 1999 (#99001097)	Southwest of the confluence of Capitol Wash and Waterpocket Canyon; 38°12′41″N 111°09′36″W	Torrey vicinity	

== See also ==
- National Register of Historic Places listings in Wayne County, Utah
- National Register of Historic Places listings in Garfield County, Utah
- National Register of Historic Places listings in Utah
