= National Register of Historic Places listings in Wayne County, Utah =

Location of Wayne County in Utah

This is a list of the National Register of Historic Places listings in Wayne County, Utah.

This is intended to be a complete list of the properties and districts on the National Register of Historic Places in Wayne County, Utah, United States. Latitude and longitude coordinates are provided for many National Register properties and districts; these locations may be seen together in a map.

There are 22 properties and districts listed on the National Register in the county. One other site in the county was once listed, but has since been removed.

This National Park Service list is complete through NPS recent listings posted July 31, 2026.

== Current listings ==
	Name on the Register	Image	Date listed	Location	City or town	Description
1	Elijah Cutler Behunin Cabin	Elijah Cutler Behunin Cabin	September 13, 1999 (#99001094)	State Route 24, 1.5 miles (2.4 km) southeast of the tip of Horse Mesa; 38°16′56″N 111°10′12″W	Torrey vicinity	
2	Bull Creek Archeological District		April 30, 1981 (#81000586)	Address Restricted	Hanksville vicinity	
3	Cathedral Valley Corral	Cathedral Valley Corral	September 13, 1999 (#99001093)	Middle Desert, southeast of the confluence of Cathedral Mountain and Cathedral Valley; 38°29′05″N 111°20′58″W	Torrey vicinity	
4	Civilian Conservation Corps Powder Magazine	Civilian Conservation Corps Powder Magazine	September 13, 1999 (#99001090)	South of the Fremont River, north of Cuts Canyon; 38°16′33″N 111°15′04″W	Torrey vicinity	
5	Cowboy Caves		August 27, 1980 (#80003993)	Address Restricted	Green River vicinity	
6	Cowboy Rock Shelter Site		June 27, 2019 (#100004109)	Address Restricted	Hanksville vicinity	
7	D.C.C. & P. Inscription "B"		October 7, 1988 (#88001251)	Confluence vicinity 38°11′17″N 109°53′12″W	Moab vicinity	
8	Fruita Rural Historic District	Fruita Rural Historic District	March 25, 1997 (#97000246)	Roughly along State Route 24 from Sulphur Creek to Hickman Natural Bridge; 38°17′06″N 111°15′07″W	Fruita	
9	Fruita Schoolhouse	Fruita Schoolhouse	February 23, 1972 (#72000098)	Capitol Reef National Park on State Route 24; 38°17′17″N 111°14′54″W	Fruita	
10	Grover School	Grover School	April 9, 1986 (#86000753)	W. 100 North St. 38°13′47″N 111°21′02″W	Grover	
11	Hanks' Dugouts	Hanks' Dugouts	September 13, 1999 (#99001095)	Confluence of Pleasant Creek and South Draw; 38°10′39″N 111°11′03″W	Torrey vicinity	
12	Hanksville Meetinghouse-School		December 18, 1990 (#90001825)	18 S. Center St. 38°22′21″N 110°42′54″W	Hanksville	
13	Harvest Scene Pictograph	Harvest Scene Pictograph	April 1, 1975 (#75000241)	Address Restricted	Green River vicinity	
14	Horseshoe Canyon Archeological District	Horseshoe Canyon Archeological District	February 23, 1972 (#72000099)	Horseshoe Canyon Detached Unit, Canyonlands National Park; 38°27′15″N 110°12′32″W	Green River and Hanksville vicinities	Originally listed as "Horseshoe (Barrier) Canyon Pictograph Panels" with a restricted address; current address represents the Archeological District boundary increase of January 24, 2012 (#11001044)
15	Charles W. and Leah Lee House	Charles W. and Leah Lee House	November 15, 1996 (#96001325)	277 W. 100 North; 38°18′02″N 111°25′33″W	Torrey	
16	Loa Tithing Office	Loa Tithing Office	March 28, 1985 (#85000687)	100 West and Center St. 38°24′07″N 111°38′38″W	Loa	
17	Lesley Morrell Line Cabin and Corral	Lesley Morrell Line Cabin and Corral	September 13, 1999 (#99001096)	Confluence of Middle Desert Wash and Cathedral Valley; 38°29′02″N 111°21′55″W	Torrey vicinity	
18	Hans Peter Nielson Gristmill	Hans Peter Nielson Gristmill	June 18, 1975 (#75001835)	3 miles (4.8 km) southeast of Bicknell; 38°18′29″N 111°30′38″W	Bicknell vicinity	
19	Oyler Mine	Oyler Mine	September 14, 1999 (#99001092)	Confluence of Grand Wash and Cohab Canyon; 38°15′33″N 111°13′51″W	Torrey vicinity	
20	Pioneer Register	Pioneer Register	September 13, 1999 (#99001097)	Southwest of the confluence of Capitol Wash and Waterpocket Canyon; 38°12′41″N 111°09′36″W	Torrey vicinity	
21	Teasdale Tithing Granary	Teasdale Tithing Granary	March 28, 1985 (#85000688)	Off State Route 117; 38°17′03″N 111°28′26″W	Teasdale	
22	Torrey Log Church-Schoolhouse	Torrey Log Church-Schoolhouse	May 14, 1993 (#93000411)	Approximately 49 E. Main St. 38°17′57″N 111°25′10″W	Torrey	

== Former listing ==
	Name on the Register	Image	Date listed	Date removed	Location	City or town	Description
1	Wayne County High School		April 1, 1985 (#85000821)	December 4, 1991	55 N. Center St. 38°20′30″N 111°32′40″W	Bicknell	

== See also ==
- List of National Historic Landmarks in Utah
- National Register of Historic Places listings in Utah
