= EPH Hanks Tower =

Summit in the state of Utah, U.S.

Eph Hanks Tower
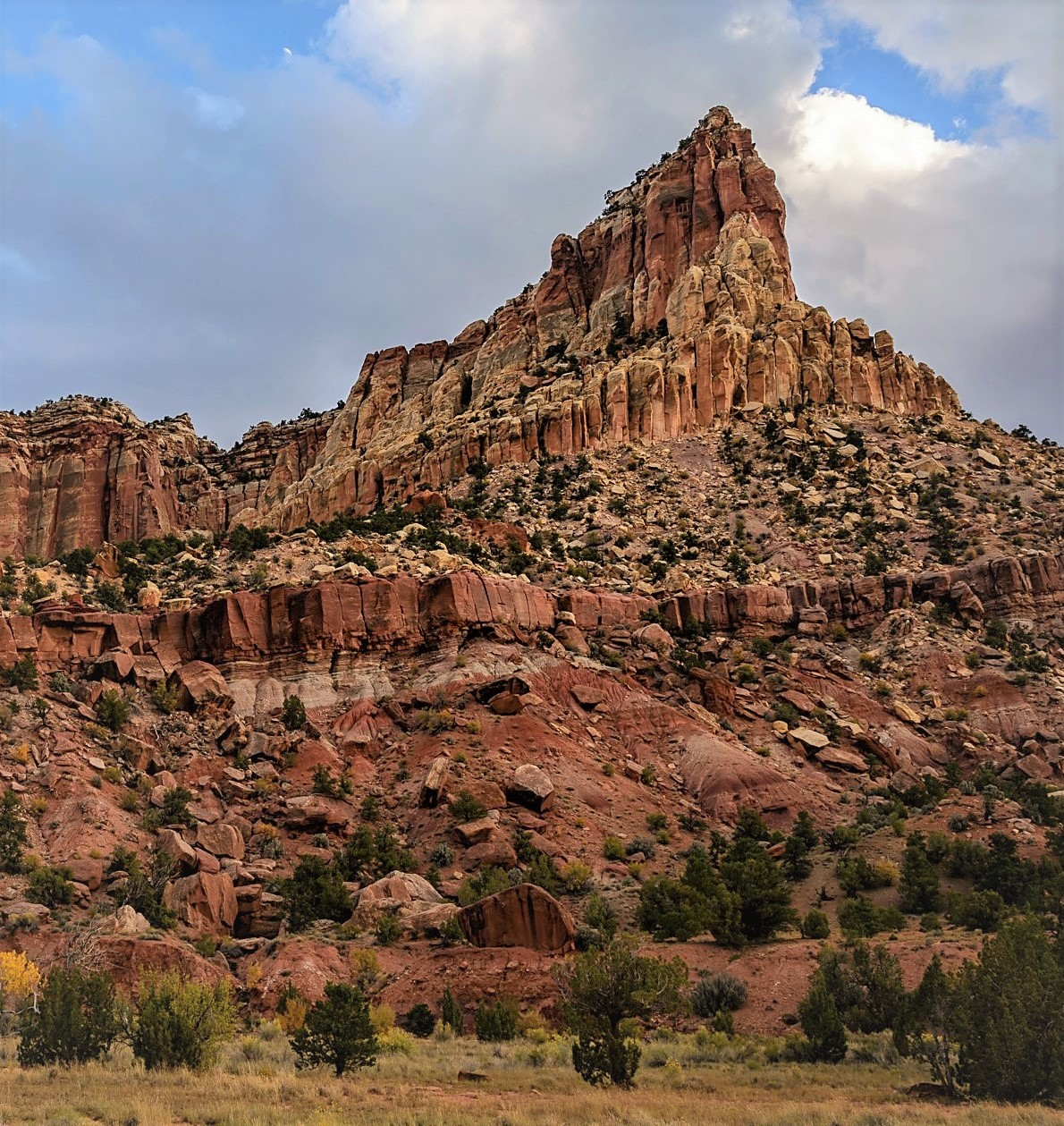
- Eph Hanks Tower, north aspect

Highest point
- Elevation: 6,540 ft (1,990 m)
- Prominence: 40 ft (12 m)
- Parent peak: Point 6945
- Isolation: 0.71 mi (1.14 km)
- Coordinates: 38°12′11″N 111°11′36″W

Geography
- Location within Utah Location within the United States
- Country: United States
- State: Utah
- County: Wayne
- Protected area: Capitol Reef National Park
- Parent range: Colorado Plateau
- Topo map: USGS Golden Throne

Geology
- Rock age: Late Triassic
- Rock type: Wingate Sandstone

Eph Hanks Tower is a 6,540-foot (1,990-meter) elevation summit located in Capitol Reef National Park, in Wayne County of Utah, United States. This landmark is situated 8 mi (13 km) southeast of the park's visitor center, 3.5 mi (5.6 km) south-southeast of Ferns Nipple, and 1.4 mi (2.3 km) south-southwest of Golden Throne, at the mouth of Capitol Gorge where the Capitol Reef Scenic Drive road ends. It towers 900 feet above the picnic area below its north aspect. Precipitation runoff from this feature is drained by Capitol Wash and Pleasant Creek, a tributary of the Fremont River, which in turn is within the Colorado River drainage basin. This geological feature is named after Ephraim Knowlton Hanks (1826–1896), a Mormon pioneer and first permanent settler in the Capitol Reef area, who with his family homesteaded in the Pleasant Creek area of Capitol Reef in 1881. Ephraim Hanks' Floral Ranch on Pleasant Creek supposedly offered a safe retreat for polygamists along the Mormon underground railroad.

== Geology ==
Eph Hanks Tower is composed of Wingate Sandstone, which is the remains of wind-borne sand dunes deposited approximately 200 million years ago in the Late Triassic. The hard Wingate Sandstone, which tends to form steep cliffs, overlays softer beds of Chinle Formation. Long after the sedimentary rocks were deposited, the Colorado Plateau was uplifted relatively evenly, keeping the layers roughly horizontal, but Capitol Reef is an exception because of the Waterpocket Fold, a classic monocline, which formed between 50 and 70 million years ago during the Laramide Orogeny.

== Gallery ==
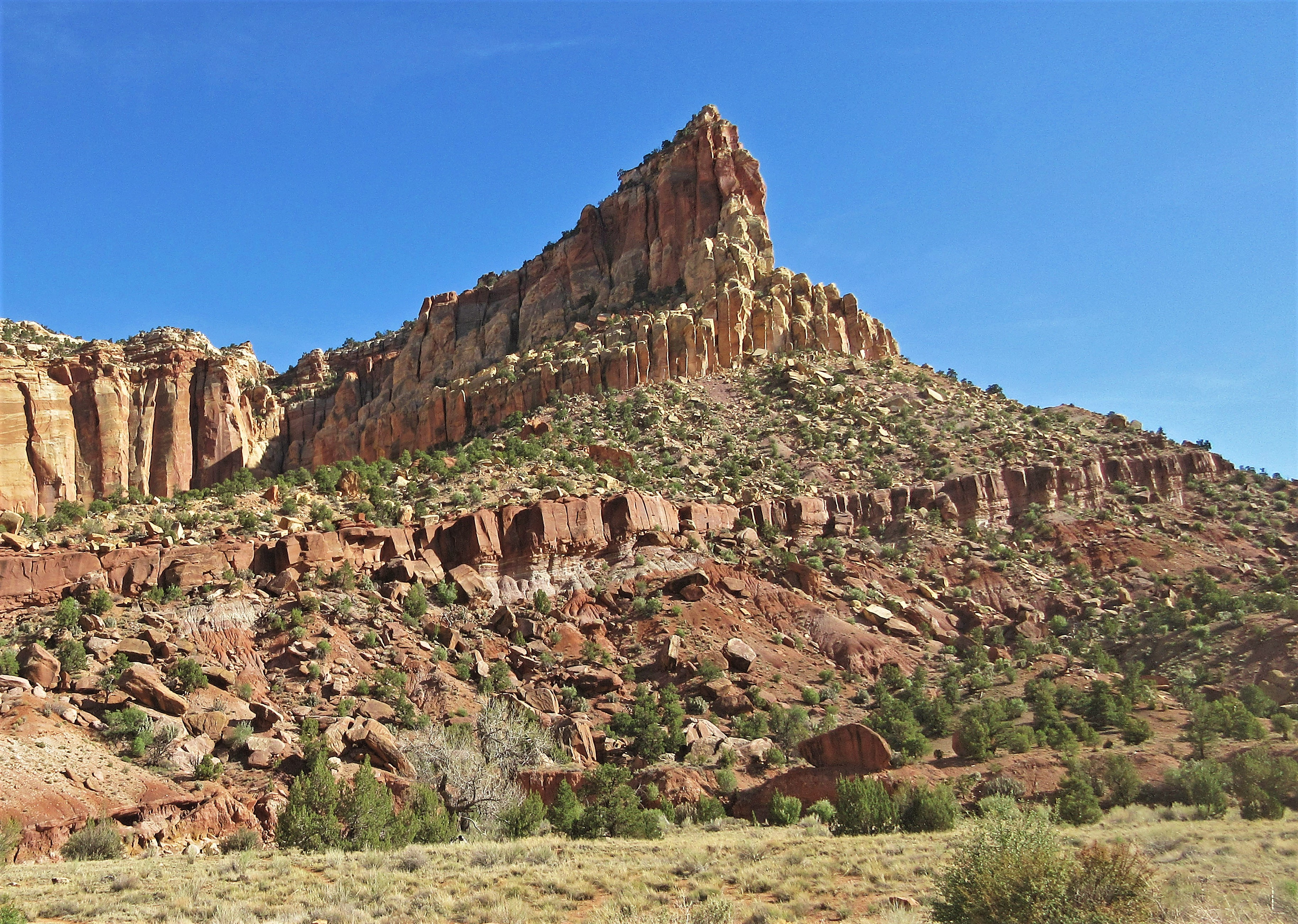

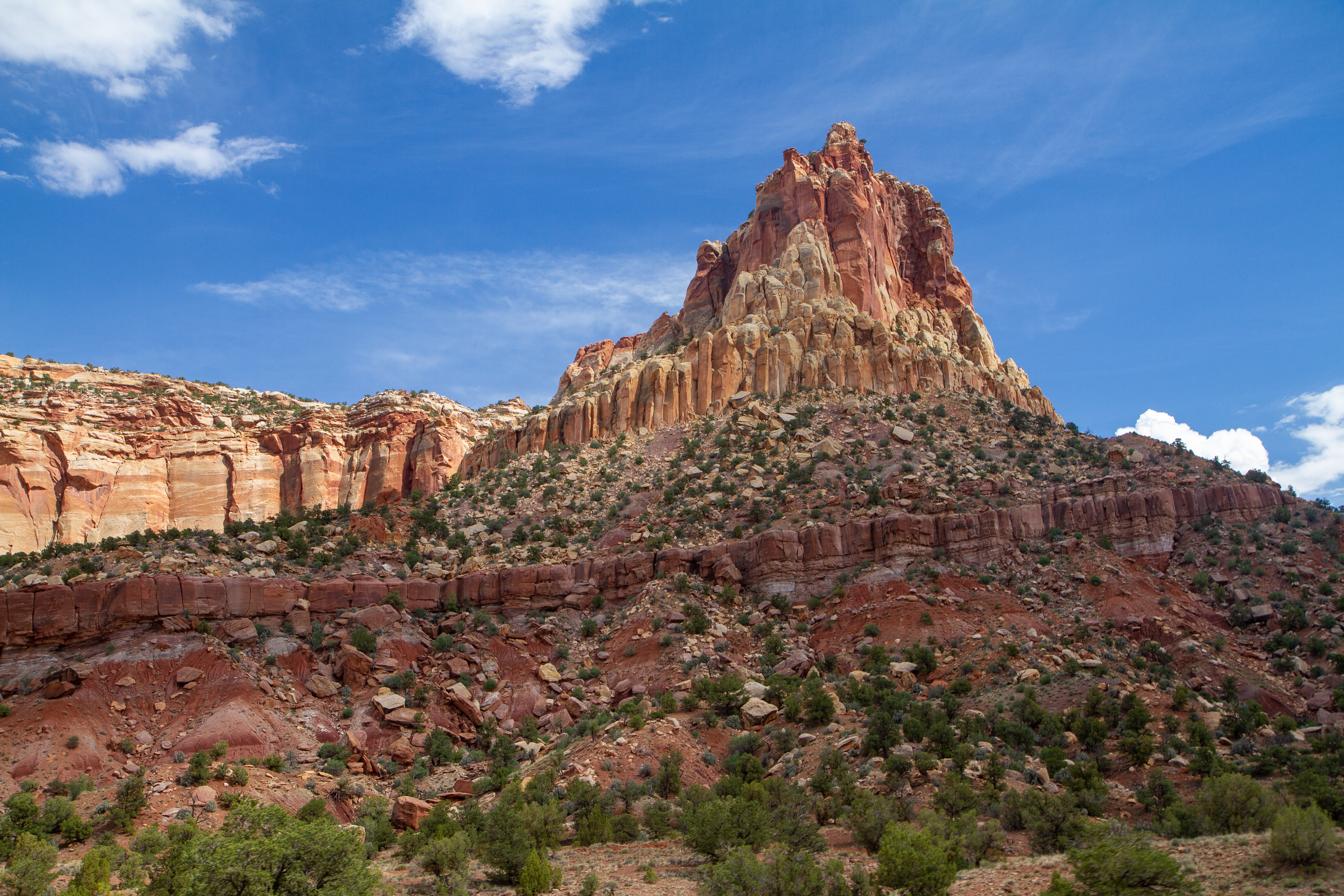
North aspect

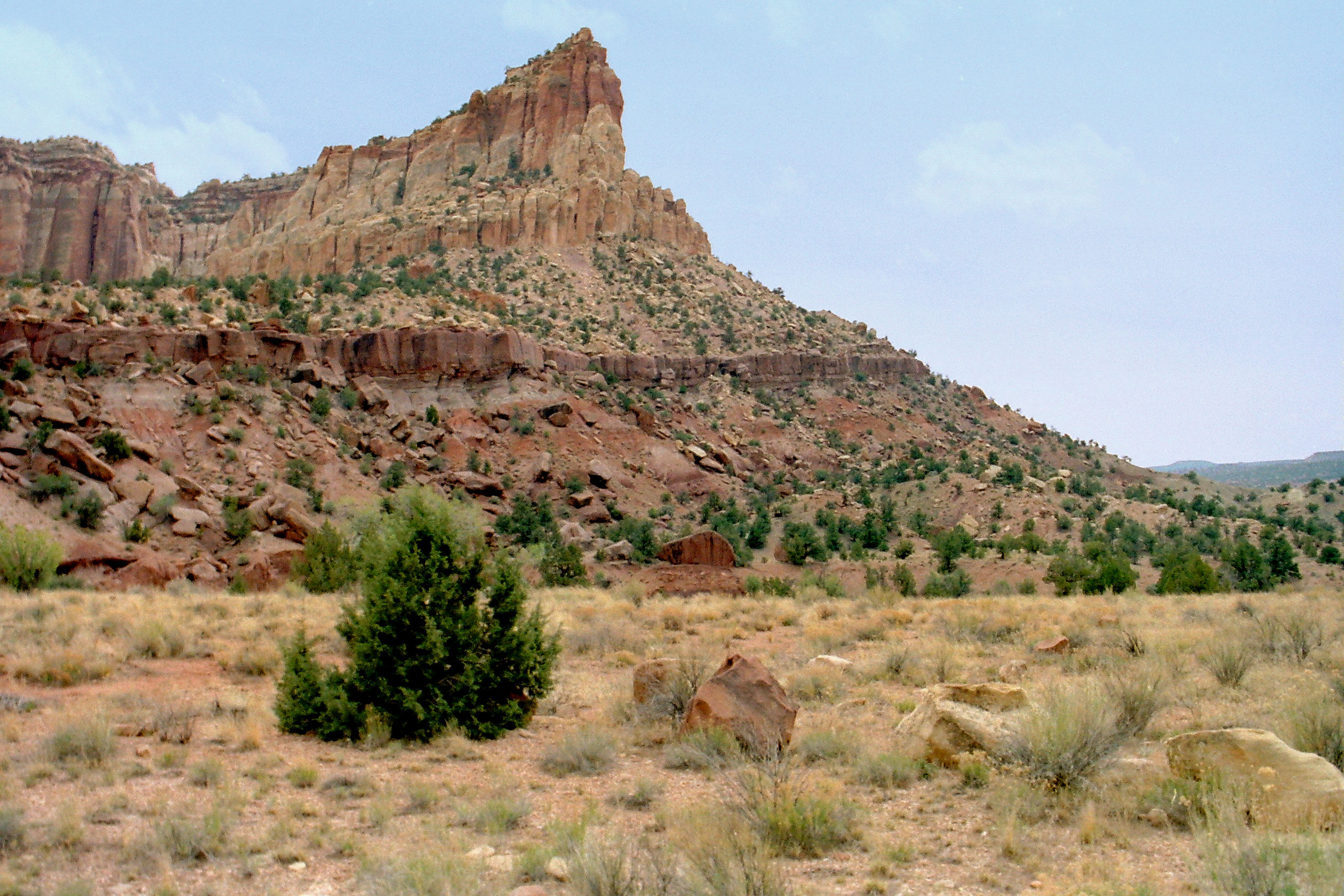

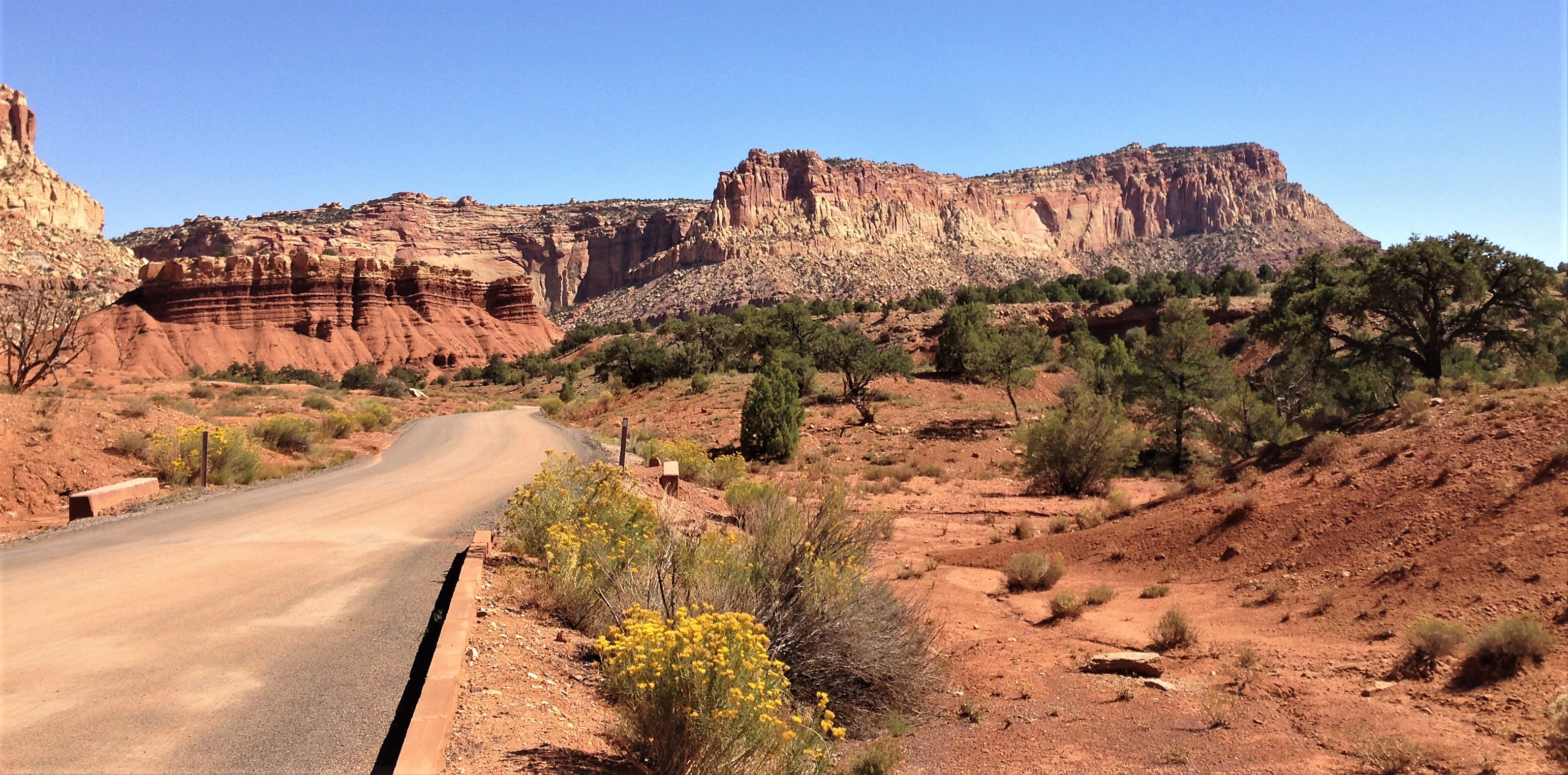
Eph Hanks Tower centered in the distance, from Capitol Reef Scenic Drive

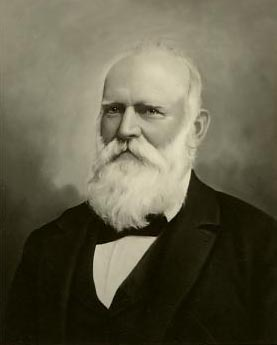
Ephraim Hanks in 1889

== Climate ==
Spring and fall are the most favorable seasons to visit Eph Hanks Tower. According to the Köppen climate classification system, it is located in a Cold semi-arid climate zone, which is defined by the coldest month having an average mean temperature below 32 °F (0 °C), and at least 50% of the total annual precipitation being received during the spring and summer. This desert climate receives less than 10 inches (250 millimeters) of annual rainfall, and snowfall is generally light during the winter.

Climate data for Capitol Reef Visitor Center, elevation 5,653 ft (1,723 m), 1981-2010 normals, extremes 1981-2019
| Month | Jan | Feb | Mar | Apr | May | Jun | Jul | Aug | Sep | Oct | Nov | Dec | Year |
|---|---|---|---|---|---|---|---|---|---|---|---|---|---|
| Record high °F (°C) | 58.6 (14.8) | 68.3 (20.2) | 78.3 (25.7) | 84.4 (29.1) | 94.6 (34.8) | 100.2 (37.9) | 100.8 (38.2) | 97.9 (36.6) | 95.4 (35.2) | 86.1 (30.1) | 70.4 (21.3) | 61.5 (16.4) | 100.8 (38.2) |
| Mean daily maximum °F (°C) | 40.6 (4.8) | 46.4 (8.0) | 54.7 (12.6) | 65.0 (18.3) | 74.5 (23.6) | 85.3 (29.6) | 90.4 (32.4) | 87.9 (31.1) | 80.2 (26.8) | 66.1 (18.9) | 51.3 (10.7) | 40.6 (4.8) | 65.3 (18.5) |
| Mean daily minimum °F (°C) | 17.8 (−7.9) | 22.7 (−5.2) | 30.2 (−1.0) | 36.2 (2.3) | 44.7 (7.1) | 53.1 (11.7) | 60.4 (15.8) | 58.5 (14.7) | 50.4 (10.2) | 39.0 (3.9) | 27.6 (−2.4) | 18.2 (−7.7) | 38.3 (3.5) |
| Record low °F (°C) | −4.2 (−20.1) | −11.8 (−24.3) | 9.1 (−12.7) | 18.1 (−7.7) | 27.2 (−2.7) | 34.6 (1.4) | 42.4 (5.8) | 45.1 (7.3) | 29.9 (−1.2) | 11.7 (−11.3) | 8.0 (−13.3) | −7.5 (−21.9) | −11.8 (−24.3) |
| Average precipitation inches (mm) | 0.52 (13) | 0.34 (8.6) | 0.53 (13) | 0.47 (12) | 0.59 (15) | 0.47 (12) | 0.91 (23) | 1.20 (30) | 0.80 (20) | 0.98 (25) | 0.49 (12) | 0.32 (8.1) | 7.62 (194) |
| Average dew point °F (°C) | 17.3 (−8.2) | 20.8 (−6.2) | 23.0 (−5.0) | 24.5 (−4.2) | 29.1 (−1.6) | 32.0 (0.0) | 40.0 (4.4) | 41.8 (5.4) | 34.8 (1.6) | 28.2 (−2.1) | 21.9 (−5.6) | 17.5 (−8.1) | 27.6 (−2.4) |
Source: PRISM

== See also ==
- Colorado Plateau
- Geology of the Capitol Reef area
