= National Register of Historic Places listings in Rich County, Utah =

Location of Rich County in Utah

This is a list of the National Register of Historic Places listings in Rich County, Utah.

This is intended to be a complete list of the properties and districts on the National Register of Historic Places in Rich County, Utah, United States. Latitude and longitude coordinates are provided for many National Register properties and districts; these locations may be seen together in a map.

There are two properties listed on the National Register in the county.

This National Park Service list is complete through NPS recent listings posted May 1, 2026.

== Current listings ==
	Name on the Register	Image	Date listed	Location	City or town	Description
1	Randolph Tabernacle	Randolph Tabernacle	April 10, 1986 (#86000724)	25 S. Main St. 41°39′55″N 111°11′06″W	Randolph	
2	Woodruff Stake House	Woodruff Stake House	December 28, 2000 (#00001586)	50 S. Main St. 41°31′23″N 111°09′42″W	Woodruff	

== See also ==
- List of National Historic Landmarks in Utah
- National Register of Historic Places listings in Utah
