= Elijah Cutler Behunin Cabin =

Historic house in Utah, United States

- Behunin, Elijah Cutler, Cabin
- U.S. National Register of Historic Places
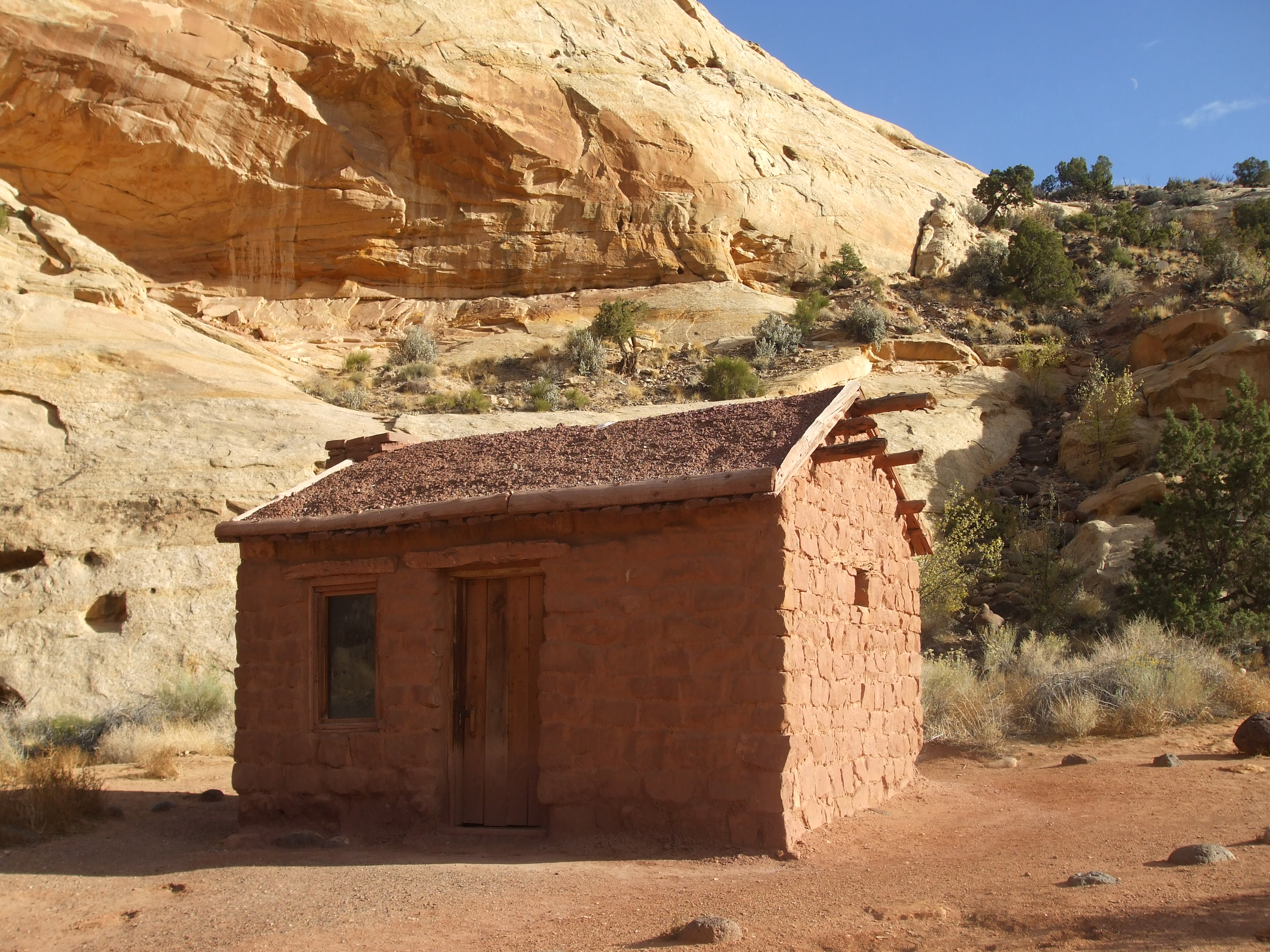

- Location within Utah Location within the United States
- Nearest city: Torrey, Utah
- Coordinates: 38°16′56″N 111°10′12″W
- Area: 0.1 acres (0.040 ha)
- Built: 1884
- Architect: Behunin, Elijah Cutler
- MPS: Capitol Reef National Park MPS
- NRHP reference No.: 99001094
- Added to NRHP: September 13, 1999

The Elijah Cutler Behunin Cabin was built to house Elijah Cutler Behunin's family in 1883–84 in what is now Capitol Reef National Park in Wayne County, Utah, United States.

== Description ==
The Behunins lived there for only a year, leaving for Fruita after a flood threatened the house and its fields. The one story sandstone structure measures 13 feet (4.0 m) by 16.5 feet (5.0 m), with a single room. Elijah and his wife and their 13 children all lived within the home. The walls are sandstone covered with a plaster-cement wash. The roof structure is wood, covered with wood sheathing and bentonite clay. The cabin was renovated in the 1960s by the National Park Service and represents the most intact example of a settler cabin in Capitol Reef National Park.

The Behunin cabin was listed on the National Register of Historic Places on September 13, 1999.

== See also ==
- National Register of Historic Places listings in Capitol Reef National Park
- National Register of Historic Places listings in Wayne County, Utah
