= National Register of Historic Places listings in Utah =

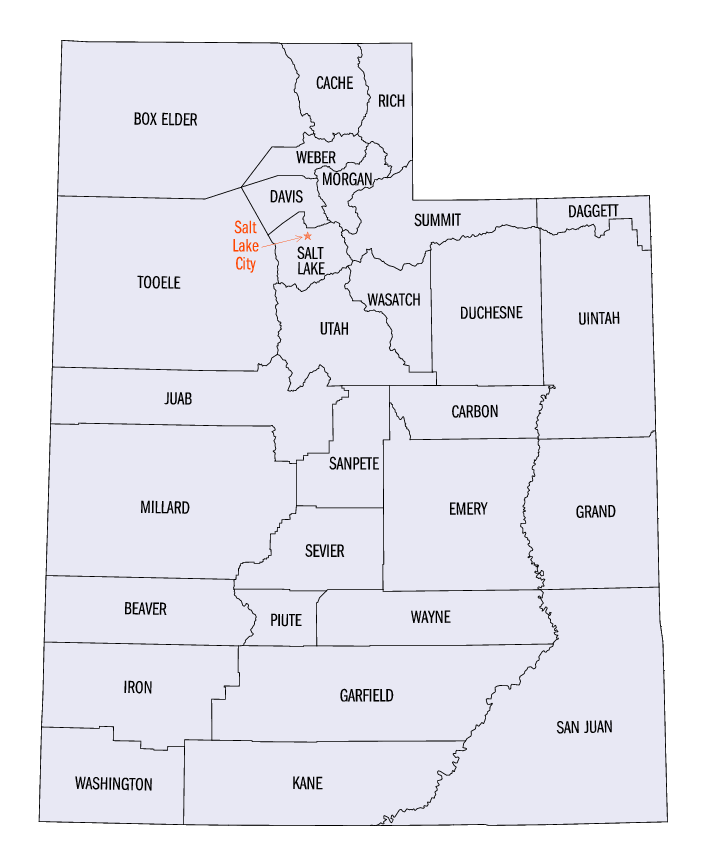
Map of Utah counties (clickable)

This is a directory of properties and districts listed on the National Register of Historic Places in Utah, USA. There are more than 1,800 listed properties in Utah. Each of the 29 counties in Utah has at least two listings on the National Register.

This National Park Service list is complete through NPS recent listings posted July 31, 2026.

== Current listings by county ==
The following are approximate tallies of current listings in Utah on the National Register of Historic Places. These counts are based on entries in the National Register Information Database as of April 24, 2008 and new weekly listings posted since then on the National Register of Historic Places web site. There are frequent additions to the listings and occasional delistings, and the counts here are not official. Also, the counts in this table exclude boundary increase and decrease listings which modify the area covered by an existing property or district and which carry a separate National Register reference number.

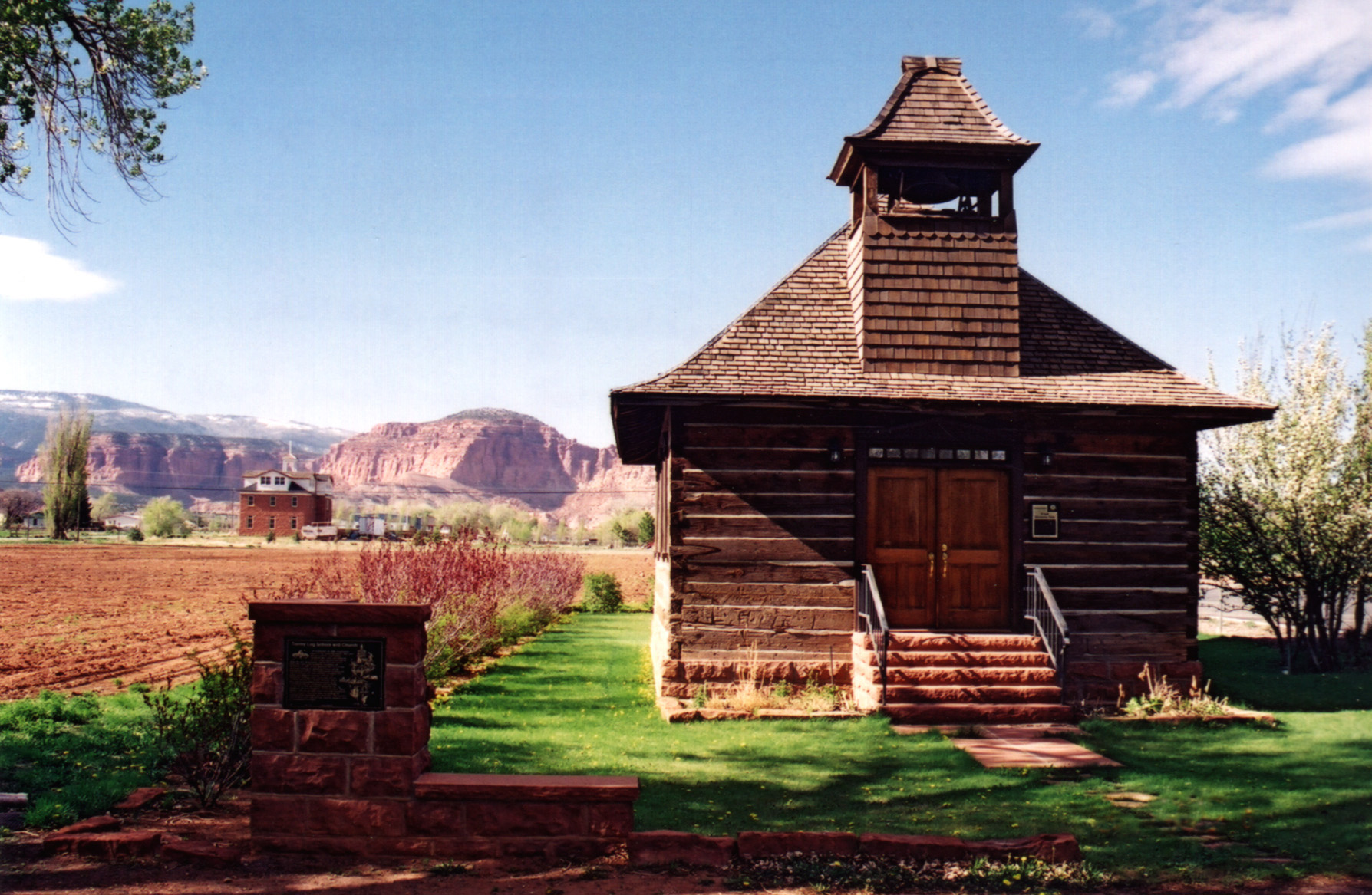
Torrey Log Church–Schoolhouse in Wayne County

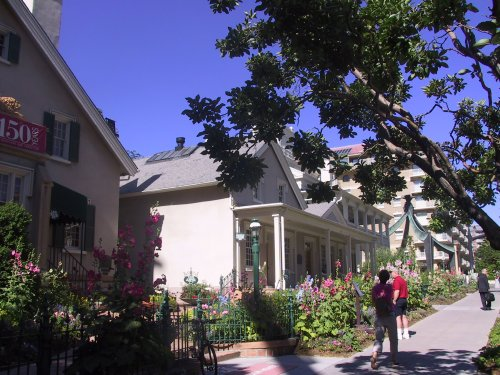
Brigham Young Complex in Salt Lake City

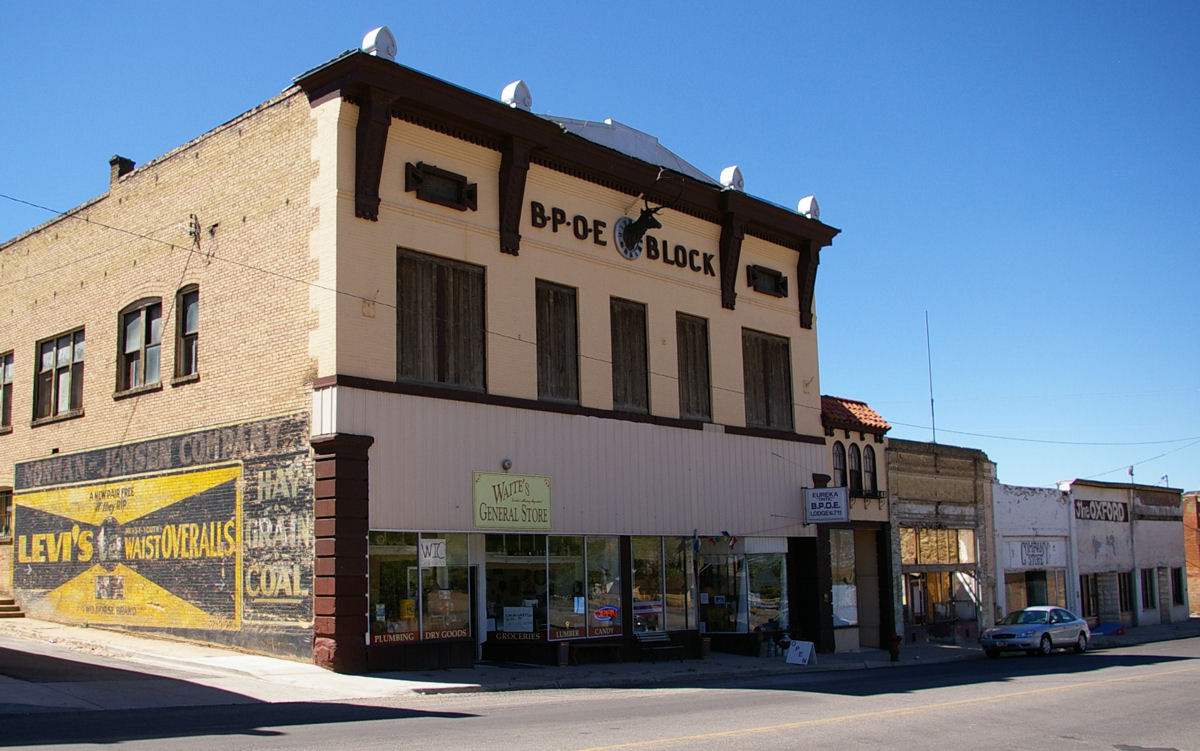
Eureka Historic District in Juab County

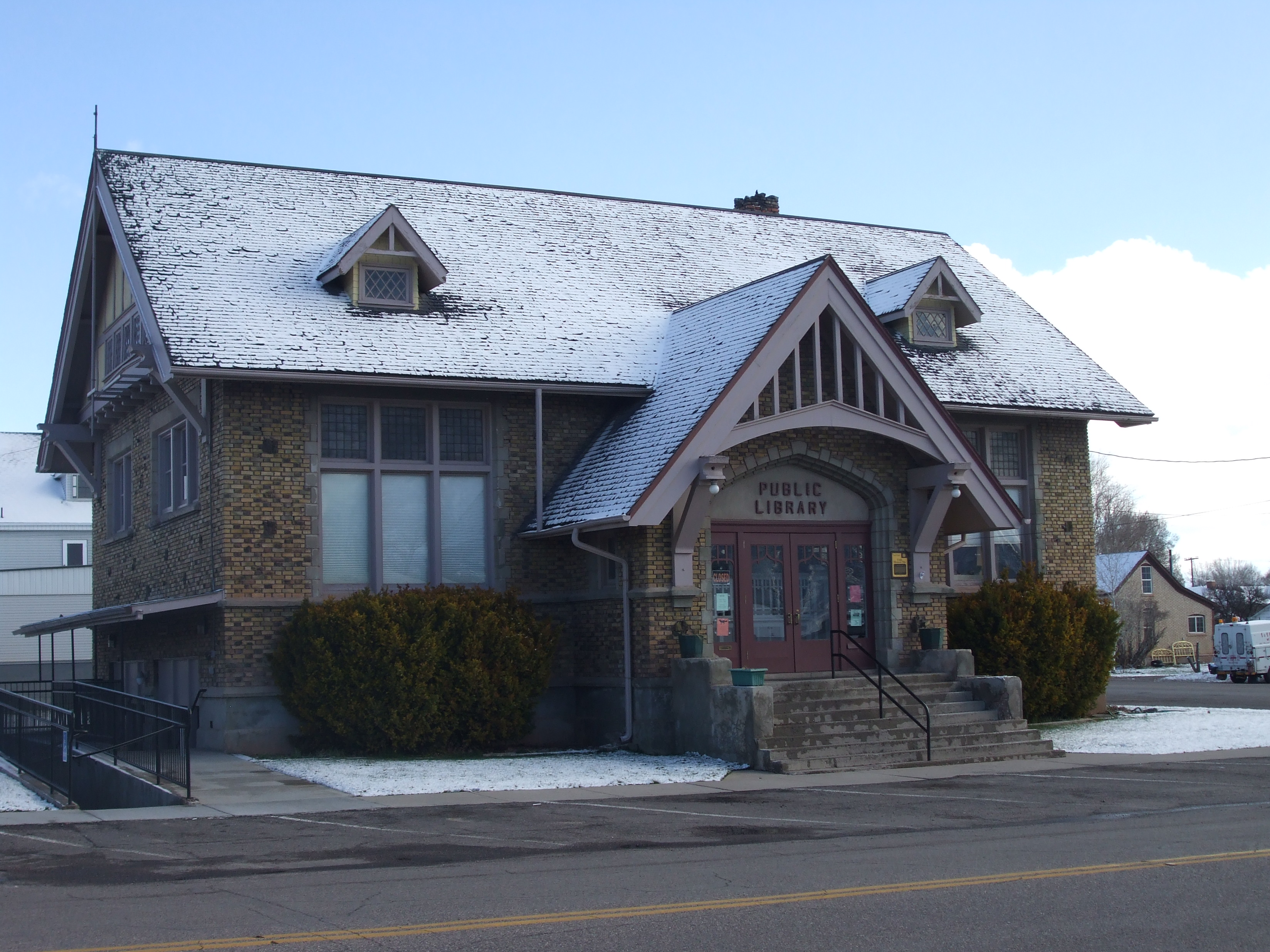
Richfield Carnegie Library in Sevier County

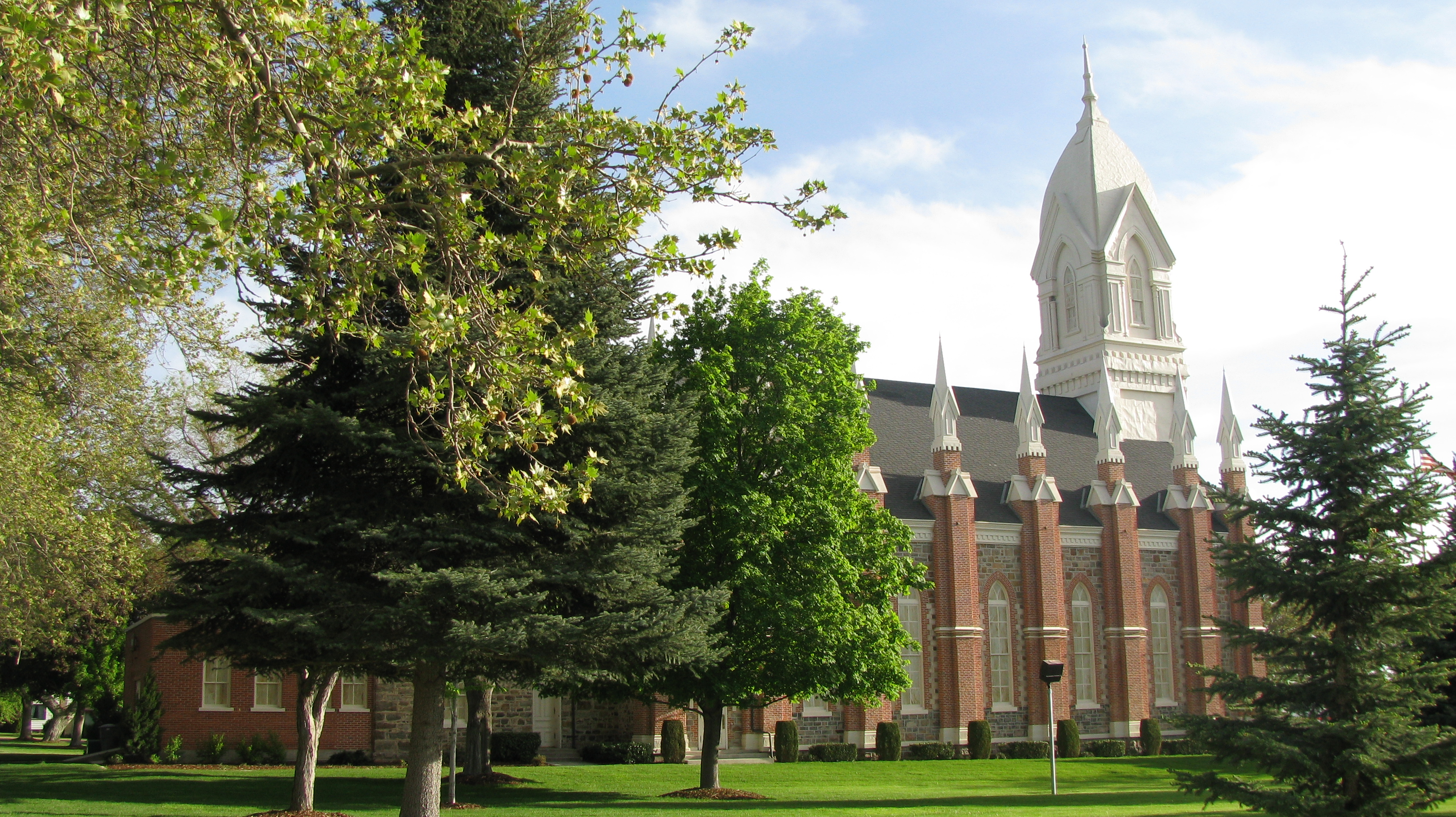
Box Elder Stake Tabernacle in Box Elder County

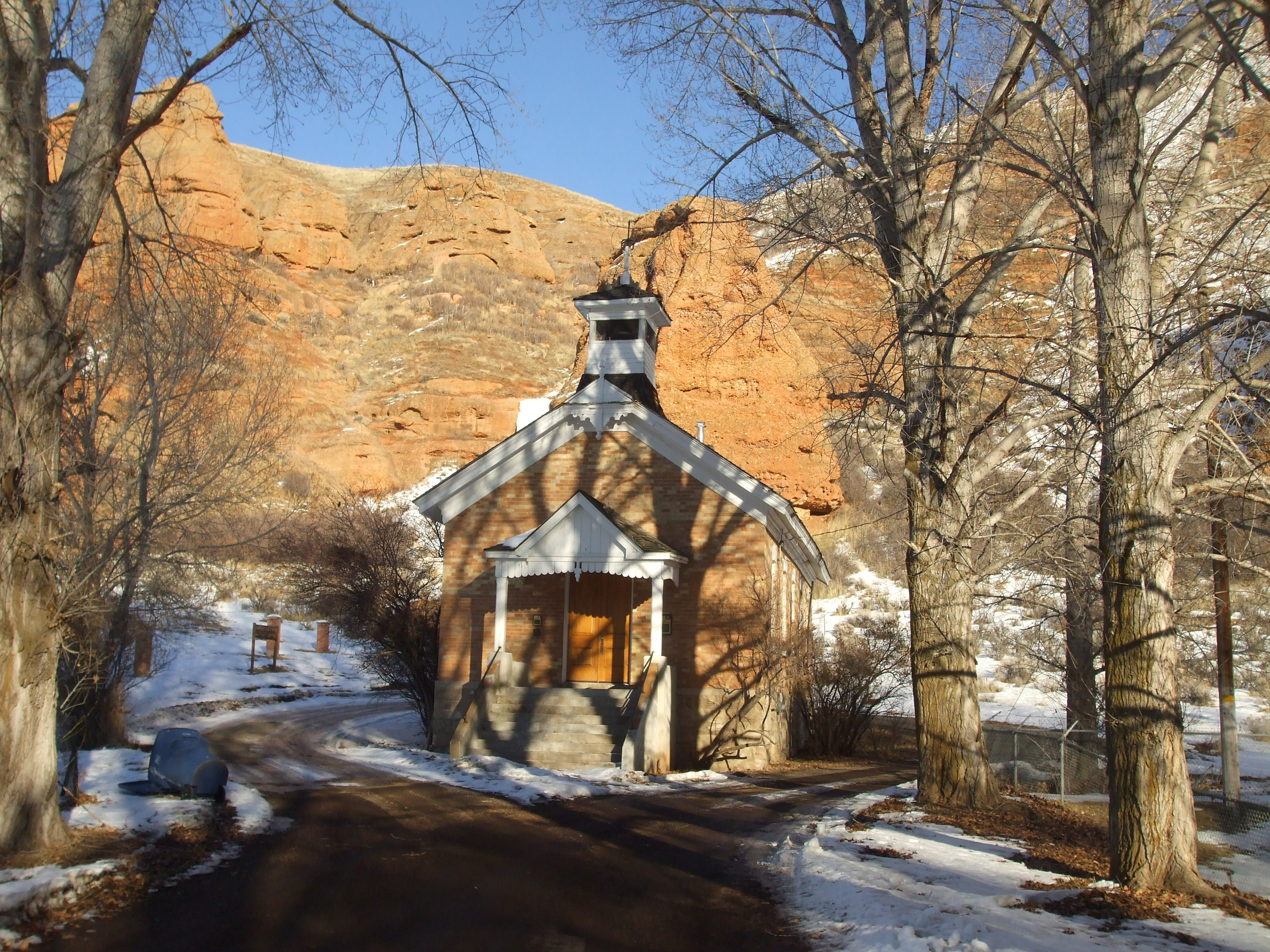
Echo Church and School in Summit County

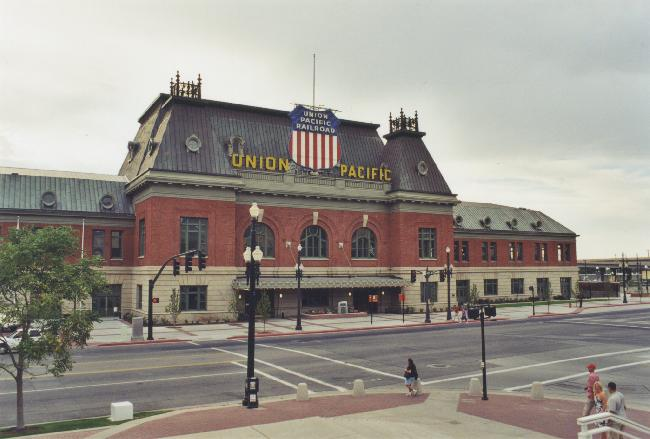
Salt Lake City Union Pacific Depot in Salt Lake City

	County	# of Sites
1	Beaver	114
2	Box Elder	44
3	Cache	78
4	Carbon	317
5	Daggett	6
6	Davis	70
7	Duchesne	37
8	Emery	22
9	Garfield	27
10	Grand	23
11	Iron	18
12	Juab	23
13	Kane	22
14	Millard	32
15	Morgan	7
16	Piute	2
17	Rich	2
18.1	Salt Lake: Salt Lake City	231
18.2	Salt Lake: Other	155
18.3	Salt Lake: Total	386
19	San Juan	40
20	Sanpete	84
21	Sevier	24
22	Summit	114
23	Tooele	31
24	Uintah	21
25	Utah	179
26	Wasatch	36
27.1	Washington: Zion National Park	29
27.2	Washington: Other	59
27.3	Washington: Total	88
28	Wayne	22
29	Weber	70
(duplicates)		(12) (Note: The following sites are listed in multiple counties: Black Rock Site (Salt Lake, Tooele), Carter Road (Daggett, Uintah), Desolation Canyon (Carbon, Emery, Grand, and Uintah), Devil's Gate-Weber Hydroelectric Power Plant Historic District (Morgan and Weber), East Entrance Checking Station, East Entrance Residence, and East Entrance Sign (Kane and Washington:Zion National Park), Hole in the Rock Trail (Garfield, Kane and San Juan), Zion – Mount Carmel Highway (Kane and Washington).)
Total:		1,923

== See also ==
- List of National Historic Landmarks in Utah
- List of bridges on the National Register of Historic Places in Utah
