= Fruita Rural Historic District =

Historic district in Utah, United States

- U.S. National Register of Historic Places
- U.S. Historic district
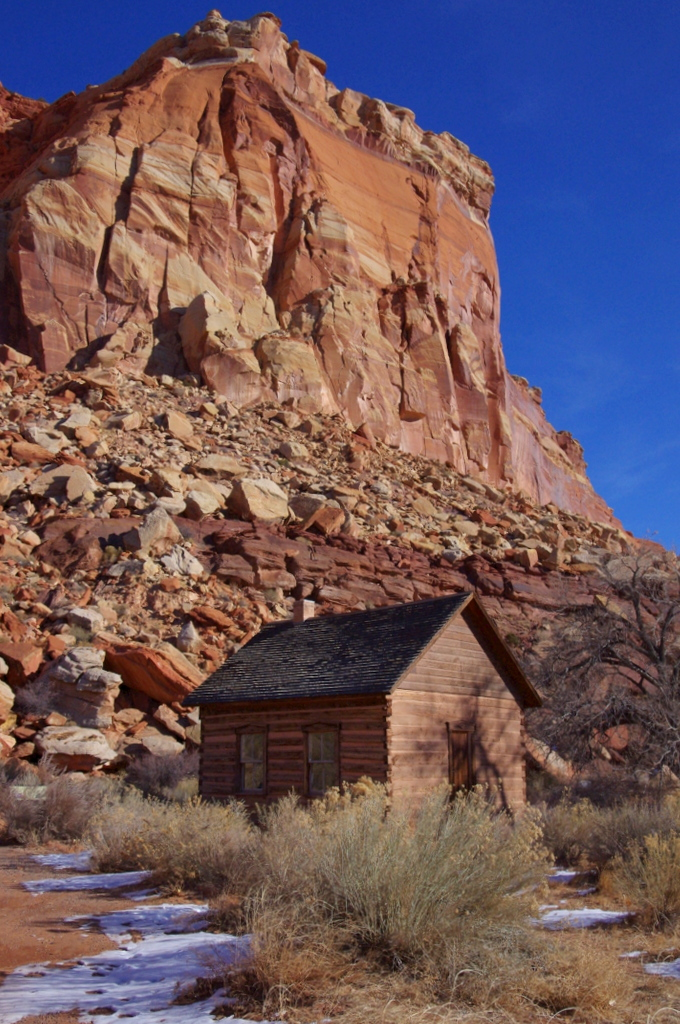
- The Fruita Schoolhouse and surroundings, December 2011

- Location within Utah Location within the United States
- Location: Capitol Reef National Park; Wayne County, Utah; United States
- Nearest city: Torrey, Utah
- Coordinates: 38°17′6″N 111°15′7″W
- Built: 1883
- Architect: multiple
- NRHP reference No.: 97000246
- Added to NRHP: March 25, 1997

The Fruita Rural Historic District is a historic district in the Capitol Reef National Park in Wayne County, Utah, United States, that is listed on the National Register of Historic Places.

== Description ==
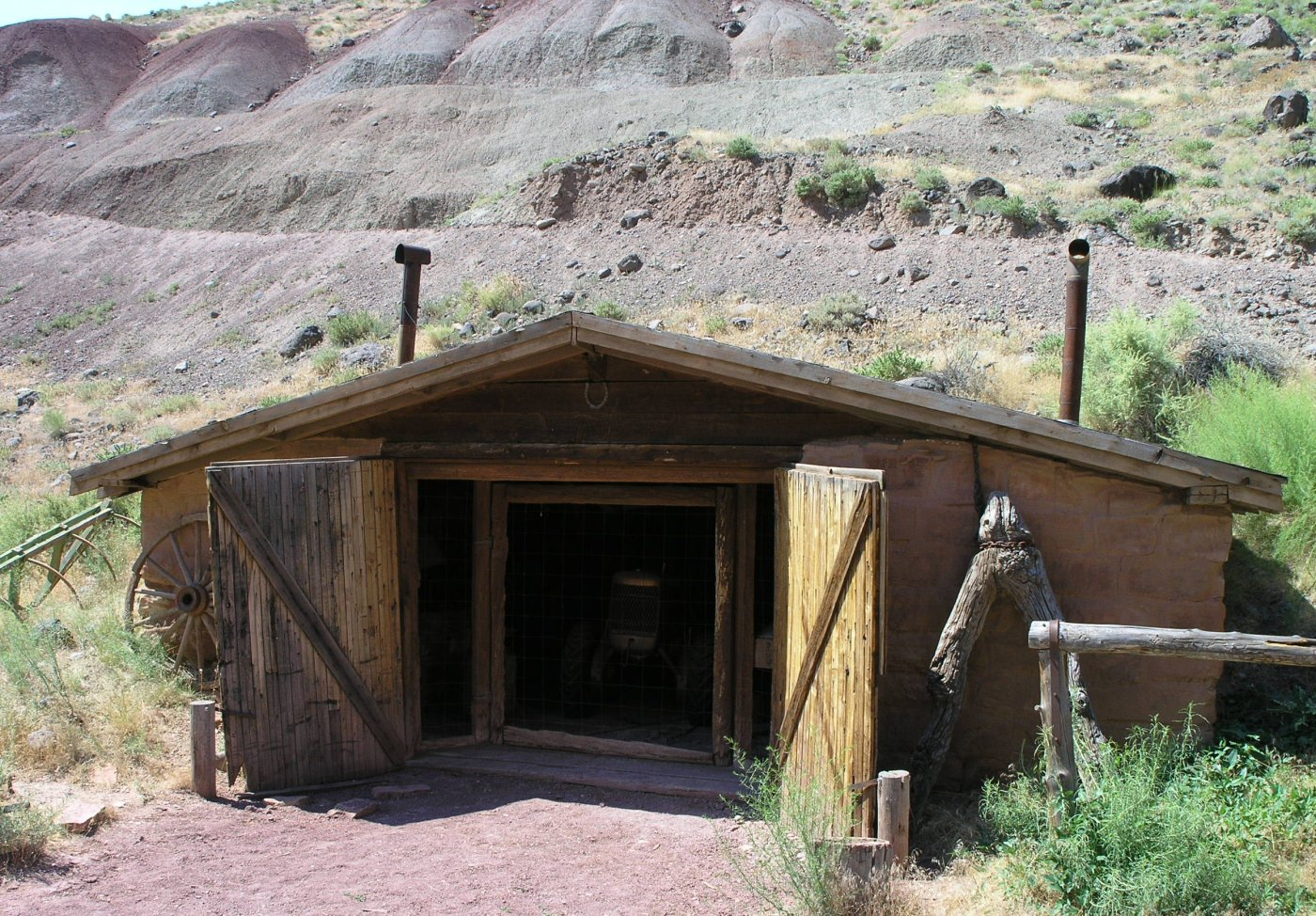
The blacksmiths shed, June 2005

The district comprises a former Mormon agricultural settlement that was active from 1895 to 1947. It includes what remains of the town of Fruita. The Leo R. Holt House, oldest in Fruita, was built in 1895 and the Fruita schoolhouse in 1896. Along with other scattered structures from the original settlement, the district also includes the 1940 ranger station, built for what was then Capitol Reef National Monument in the National Park Service Rustic style and constructed by the Civilian Conservation Corps. Later development included the Mission 66 park visitor center.

The orchards that gave Fruita its name are preserved as a "historic landscape" by the National Park Service.

== See also ==
- National Register of Historic Places listings in Wayne County, Utah
