= Loa Tithing Office =

- U.S. National Register of Historic Places
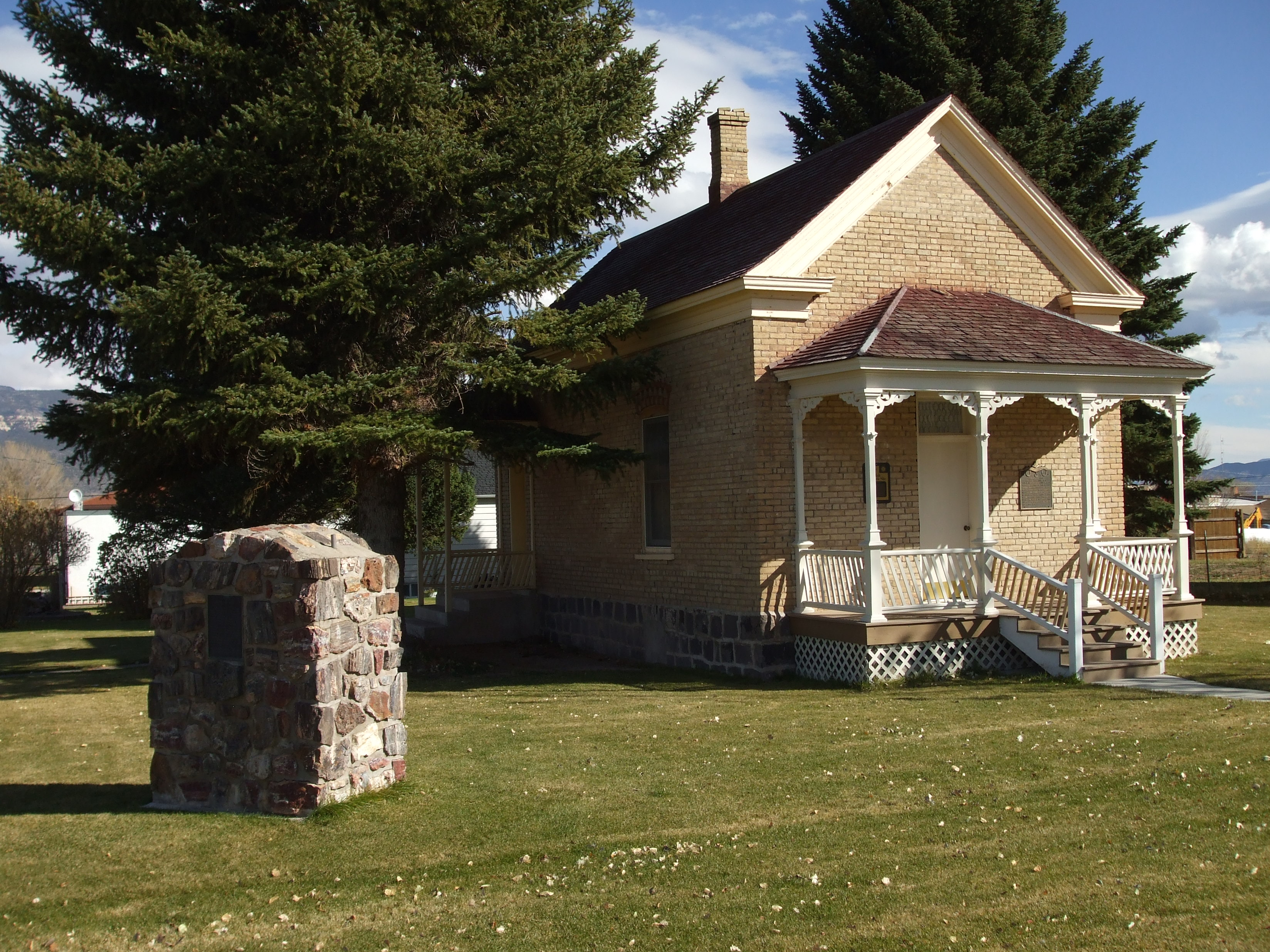
- The building in 2009

- Location within Utah Location within the United States
- Location: 100 West and Center Street, Loa, Utah
- Coordinates: 38°24′07″N 111°38′38″W
- Area: 0.3 acres (0.12 ha)
- Built: 1897
- Built by: Peter Christensen, Benjamin E. Brown
- Architectural style: Greek Revival
- MPS: Tithing Offices and Granaries of the Mormon Church TR
- NRHP reference No.: 85000687
- Added to NRHP: March 28, 1985

The Loa Tithing Office is a historic building in Loa, Utah. It was built in 1897 by bricklayer Peter Christensen and carpenter Benjamin E. Brown as a tithing building for members of the Church of Jesus Christ of Latter-day Saints, and it was designed in the Greek Revival style. It was acquired by the Daughters of Utah Pioneers in 1972. The building has been listed on the National Register of Historic Places since March 28, 1985.
