= Ephraim Hanks =

American Mormon leader (1826–1896)

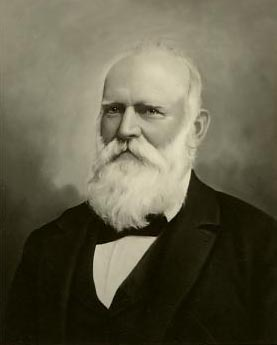
Ephraim Hanks in 1889.

Ephraim Knowlton Hanks (21 March 1826 – 9 June 1896) was a prominent member of the 19th-Century Latter Day Saint movement, a Mormon pioneer and a well known leader in the early settlement of Utah.

Hanks was born in Madison, Lake County, Ohio, the son of Benjamin Hanks and Martha Knowlton, his second wife. Hanks left home at age 16, working for a time on the Erie Canal and then serving in the United States Navy. Returning home to Ohio, he learned his brother Sidney had joined The Church of Jesus Christ of Latter-day Saints. Hanks soon accepted the young church's teachings and became a member in 1845.

Hanks left Nauvoo, Illinois, with the LDS followers of Brigham Young on the trek west to the Rocky Mountains. He left the main body of emigrants to join Company B of the Mormon Battalion, United States Army, and marched with them to San Diego as a private. He and other Battalion members marched from the Midwest, south through Arizona, and were released from service in California. Battalion members rejoined the Mormon emigrants from the west, traveling from California to the Salt Lake Valley.

In 1850, when Brigham Young authorized a campaign against the Timpanogos, he volunteered as part of the Mormon militia. On February 8, in what was known as the Battle at Fort Utah, the army attacked the Timpanogos village. On the second day of fighting, he was chosen as part of 16 men to make a charge on a Timpanogos log house, from which the Timpanogos were trying to defend themselves. They successfully took the log cabin, and the Timpanogos retreated. They were able to pursue and kill around 100 Timpanogos people, many by execution.

In 1856, Hanks played a key role in the rescue of the Martin handcart company, although he wasn't present during the Sweetwater crossing. Hanks also led a militia company in scouting expeditions during the Utah War in 1857 and 1858.

As a member of the Church of Jesus Christ of Latter-day Saints, Hanks practiced plural marriage, having 4 wives and 26 children. His wives were Harriet Amelia Decker (m. 22 September 1848), Jane Maria Capener (m. 27 March 1856), Thisbe Quilley Read (m. 5 April 1862). His fourth wife, Hannah Hardy, never lived with Hanks and the union was dissolved in 1856.

Hanks was ordained a Patriarch in The Church of Jesus Christ of Latter-day Saints and was known for his obedience to church leaders. President Brigham Young said that Hanks "... was a man always ready to lay down his life for the authorities of the Church as well as for the cause of Zion and her people." (Richard K. Hanks, pp. 2627.)

Hanks was a U.S. mail carrier from 1851 to 1853 and later acted as a station master for the Pony Express, facilitating mail service on the Mormon Trail to Salt Lake through Utah's Emigration Canyon. Hanks' Station was located on the Mormon Trail in Mountain Dell, a valley between the Big Mountain and Little Mountain, also known as Big Canyon, named for the creek that still runs through that area. The historic station has been removed, but its site sits on the edge of what is now Little Dell Reservoir.

Hanks died at his home at Floral Ranch, Wayne County, Utah and buried in the Caineville Cemetery.

== Rescue of the Martin handcart company ==
One of the first on the scene during the rescue of the 1856 Martin handcart company, Hanks provided buffalo meat to the starving party. As the company moved from day to day, Ephraim Hanks killed many buffalo: "The most remarkable thing about it was that I had traveled that road more than fifty times, and never before saw so many buffaloes in that part of the country. There was not a member of the party but what believed that the Lord had sent them to us in answer to prayer."

Hanks also administered to the sick and dying. Finding many of the emigrants with frozen hands and feet, Hanks later wrote: "Many such I washed with water and castile soap, until the frozen parts would fall off."

Hanks provided another important service: "Many of the Saints had frozen limbs which were endangering their lives. Brother Hanks anointed these folks and prayed that an amputation could be done without pain. Then he took out his great hunting knife, held to the fire to cleanse it, and took off the dying limb with its keen blade; many with tears in their eyes said they hadn't felt a thing."

== Cultural references ==
Hanks was the protagonist in the 2013 movie Ephraim's Rescue, directed by T.C. Christensen.

EPH Hanks Tower, a landmark in Capitol Reef National Park, is named after him.
