= Woodruff Stake House =

- U.S. National Register of Historic Places
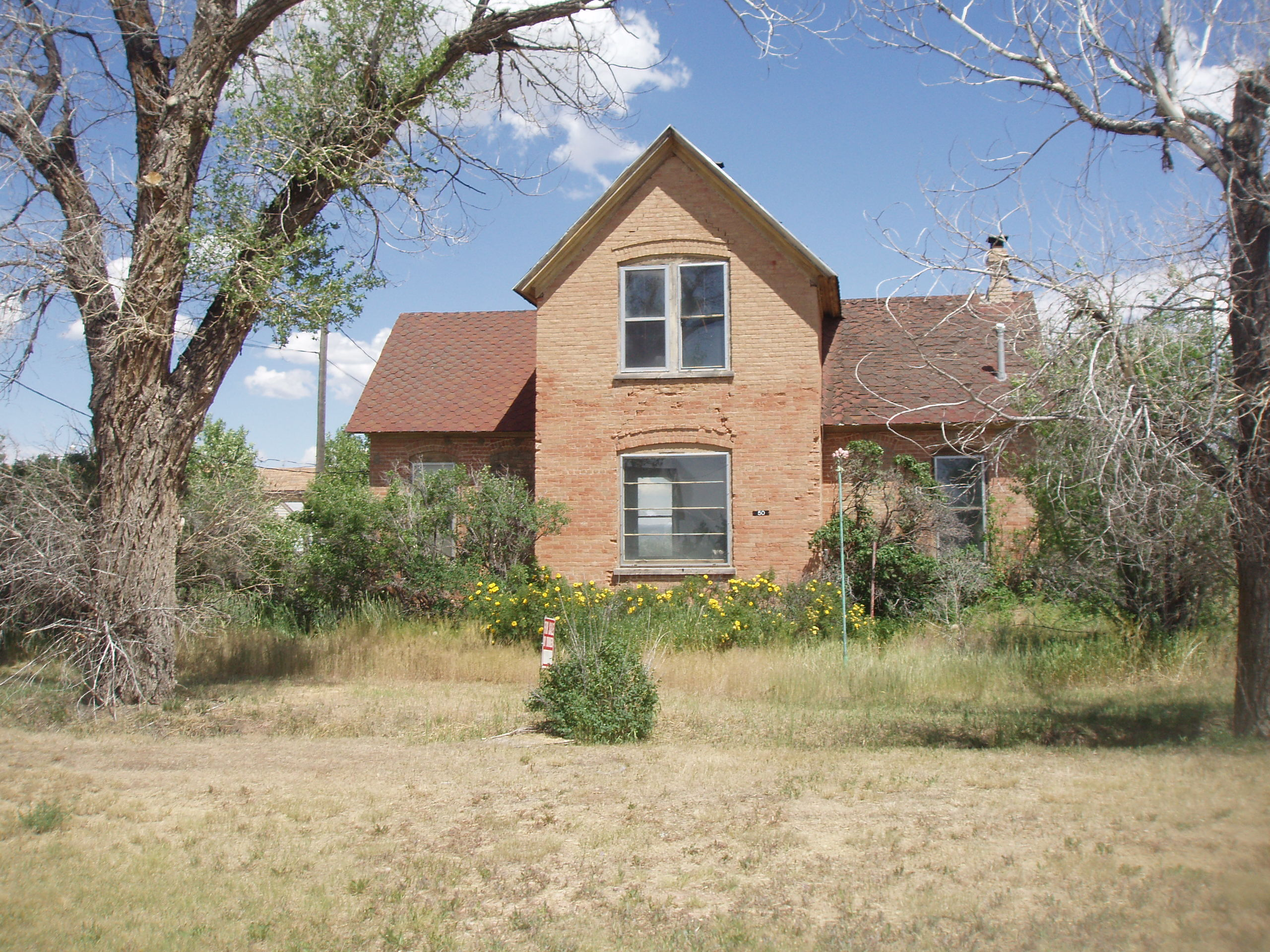

- Location within Utah Location within the United States
- Location: 50 South Main, Woodruff, Utah
- Coordinates: 41°31′23″N 111°9′42″W
- Area: less than one acre
- Built: 1900-1901
- Architectural style: cross wing
- MPS: Tithing Offices and Granaries of the Mormon Church TR
- NRHP reference No.: 00001586
- Added to NRHP: December 28, 2000

The Woodruff Stake House at 50 South Main in Woodruff, Utah was built during 1900–1901. It was listed on the National Register of Historic Places in 2000. It has also been known as Woodruff Stake Tithing House.
