= Hanksville Meetinghouse-School =

- U.S. National Register of Historic Places
- Location within Utah Location within the United States
- Location: Sawmill Basin Rd., Hanksville, Utah
- Coordinates: 38°22′21″N 110°42′54″W
- Area: less than one acre
- Built: c.1911-c.1914
- Built by: Frank J. Weber
- Architectural style: Vernacular Mormon church
- MPS: Mormon Church Buildings in Utah MPS
- NRHP reference No.: 90001825
- Added to NRHP: December 18, 1990

The Hanksville Meetinghouse-School, at 18 South Center Street in Hanksville, Utah, was built starting around 1911 and completing around 1914. It was listed on the National Register of Historic Places in 1990.

Built to serve as a Latter-day Saint church building and school, it replaced a c.1888 log church and a c.1890 log school. It was built by Frank J. Weber, who operated a hotel and livery stable business.

It is a vernacular one-story stone building with a gable roof, built upon a stone foundation. Its exterior walls are random ashlar, made of local sandstone. Two exterior chimneys were added later, perhaps in the 1950s.

It also served as a civic center/town hall, as well as the only school in Hanksville for a while. A new stone school was built next door in 1920, and the meetinghouse continued to serve as a church until a chapel was built elsewhere in the town in 1967.

It is one of only 20 "first period" Mormon meetinghouses surviving, and one of only three of those that had multiple functions/purposes and have not been greatly altered since.
