= Fruita Schoolhouse =

- U.S. National Register of Historic Places
- U.S. Historic district – Contributing property
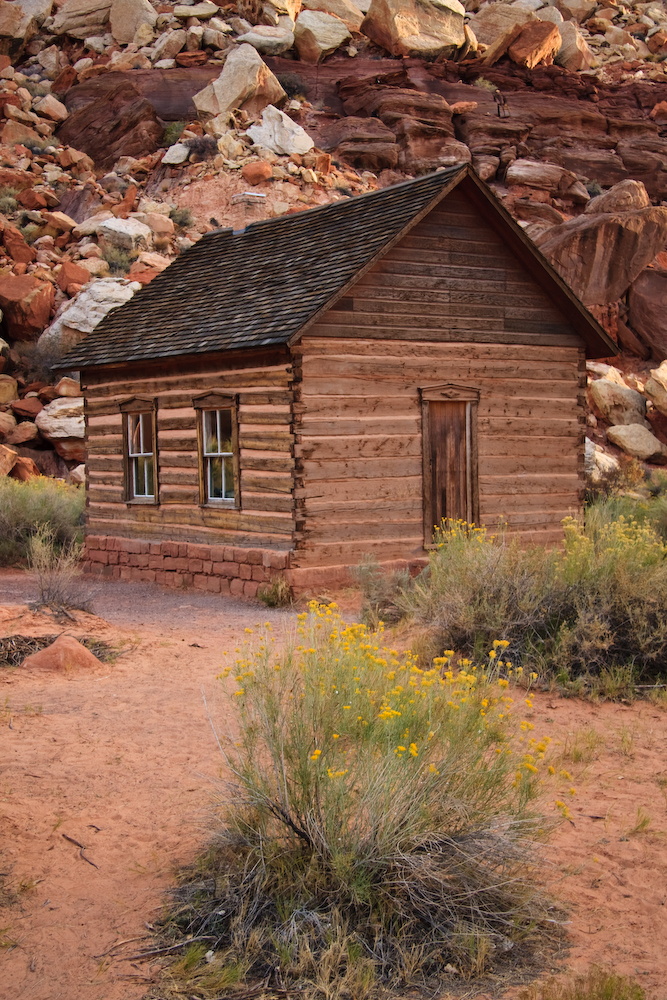
- Location: Fruita, Utah
- Coordinates: 38.2881°N 111.2482°W
- Built: 1896
- Part of: Fruita Rural Historic District (ID97000246)
- NRHP reference No.: 72000098

Significant dates
- Added to NRHP: February 23, 1972
- Designated CP: March 25, 1997

The Fruita Schoolhouse is a historic school building located in Fruita, Utah, United States.

== Description ==
The Behunin family, early settlers of the Capitol Reef area, donated the land in 1892. For over a decade the school had a dirt roof and in 1935 the bare walls were chinked in. Elijah Cutler Behunin donated the land for the school and his daughter, Nettie Behunin, was the school's first teacher. In 1895 the school became part of the Junction School Precinct and remained a functional grade school until 1941. From 1941 until its induction into the U.S. National Register of Historic Places in 1973, the building was unoccupied.

== Images ==
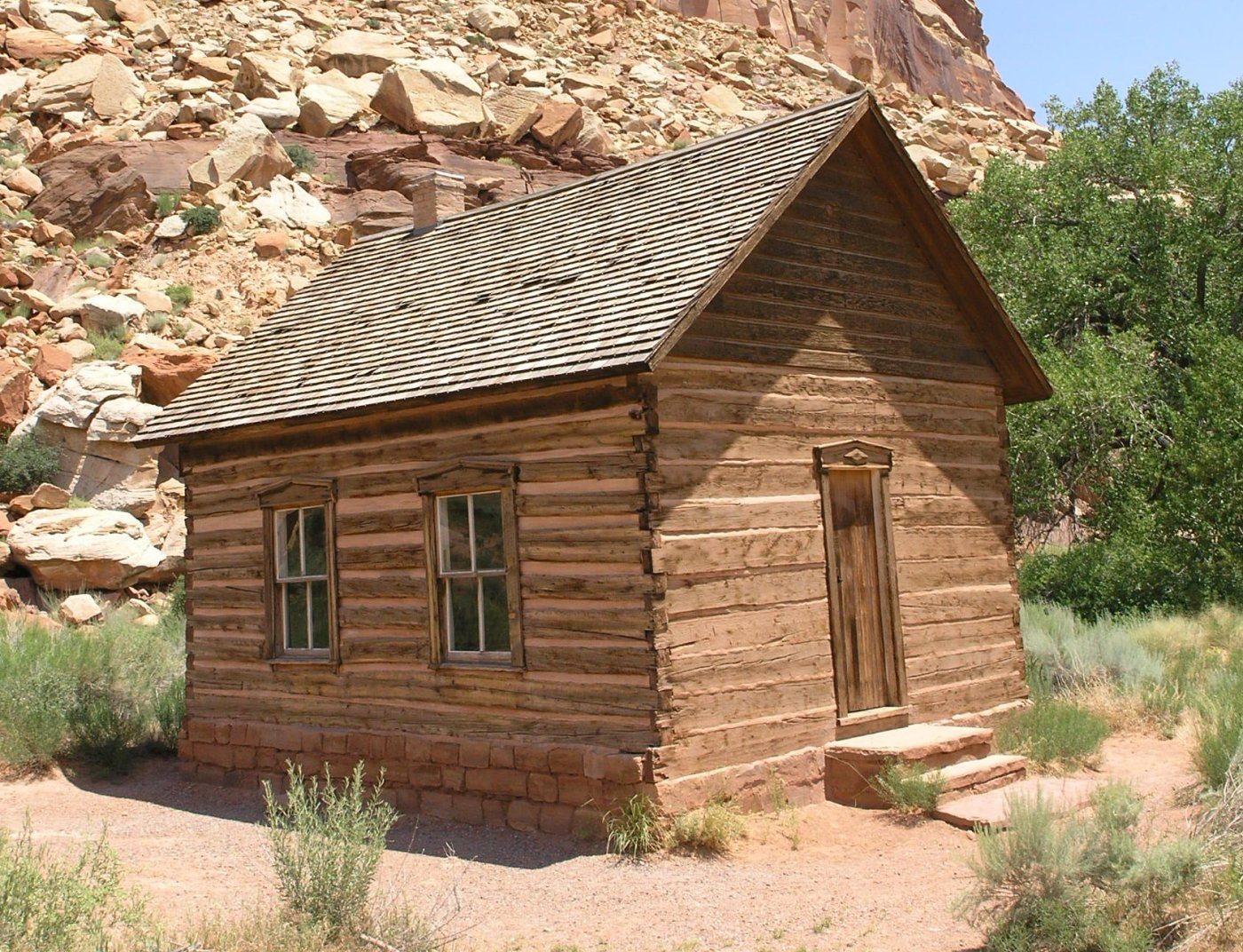

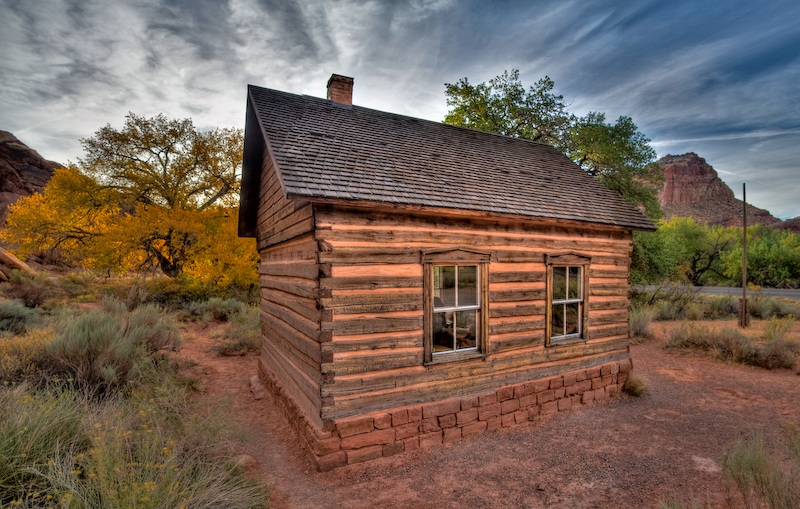

== See also ==
- National Register of Historic Places listings in Wayne County, Utah
