= Ferns Nipple =

Summit in Capitol Reef National Park, Utah, USA

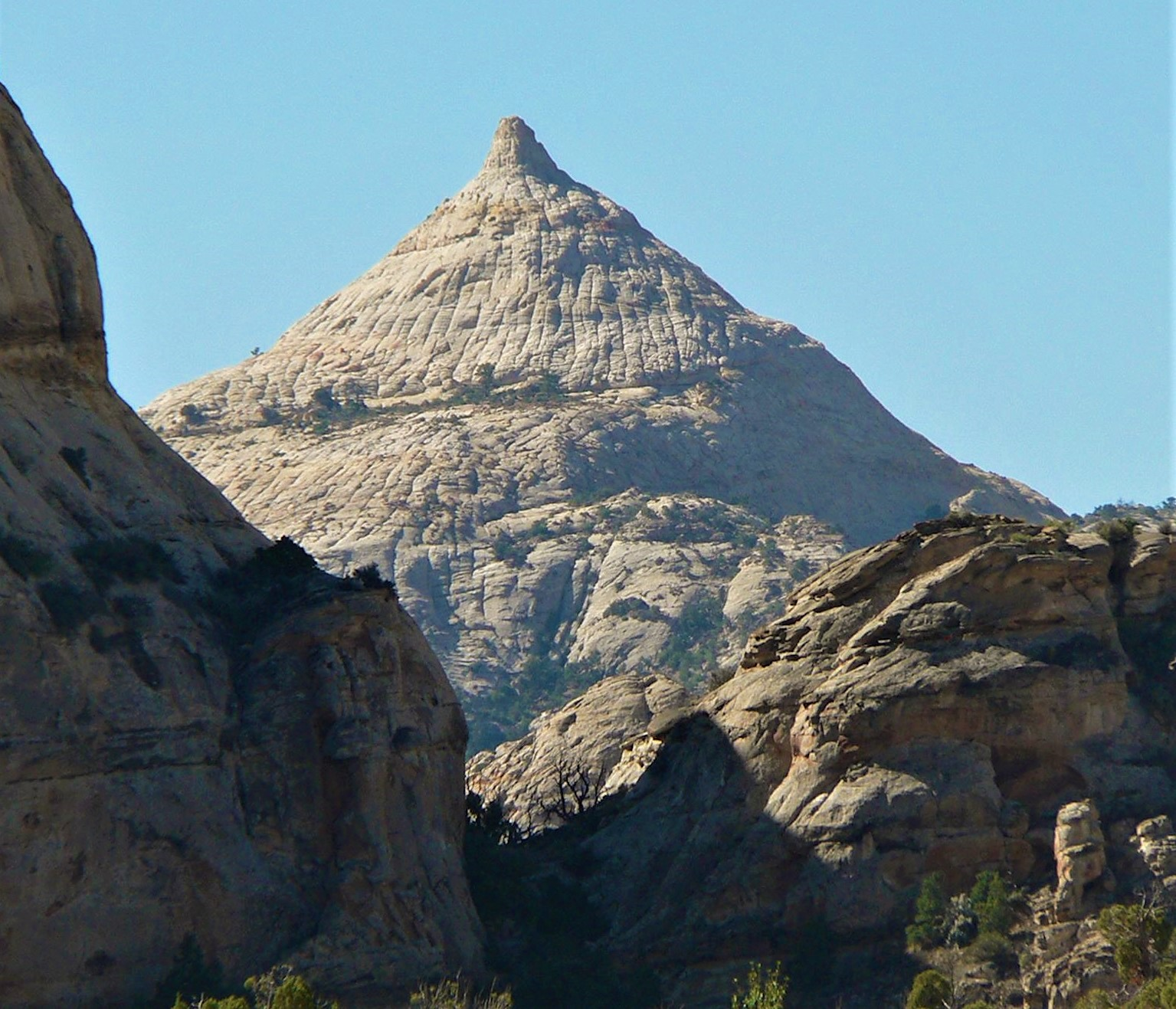
- Ferns Nipple, north aspect

Highest point
- Elevation: 7,065 ft (2,153 m)
- Prominence: 305 ft (93 m)
- Parent peak: Peak 7100
- Isolation: 0.96 mi (1.54 km)
- Coordinates: 38°14′50″N 111°12′48″W

Geography
- Location within Utah Location within the United States
- Country: United States
- State: Utah
- County: Wayne
- Protected area: Capitol Reef National Park
- Parent range: Colorado Plateau
- Topo map: USGS Golden Throne

Geology
- Rock age: Jurassic
- Rock type: Navajo Sandstone

Climbing
- Easiest route: class 4 scrambling

Ferns Nipple is a 7,065-foot (2,153-meter) elevation summit located in Capitol Reef National Park, in Wayne County of Utah, United States. This iconic landmark is situated four miles (6.4 km) southeast of the park's visitor center. Precipitation runoff from this feature is drained by tributaries of the Fremont River, which in turn is within the Colorado River drainage basin. Folklore attributes this geological feature's naming to outlaw Butch Cassidy and his favored girlfriend named Fern.

== Climate ==
According to the Köppen climate classification system, it is located in a Cold semi-arid climate zone, which is defined by the coldest month having an average mean temperature below 32 °F (0 °C), and at least 50% of the total annual precipitation being received during the spring and summer. This desert climate receives less than 10 inches (250 millimeters) of annual rainfall, and snowfall is generally light during the winter.

== Geology ==
Ferns Nipple is composed of Navajo Sandstone, which is believed to have formed about 180 million years ago as a giant sand sea, the largest in Earth's history. In a hot, dry climate, wind blew over sand dunes, creating large, sweeping crossbeds which date to the Jurassic. Long after the sedimentary rocks were deposited, the Colorado Plateau was uplifted relatively evenly, keeping the layers roughly horizontal, but Capitol Reef is an exception because of the Waterpocket Fold, a classic monocline, which formed between 50 and 70 million years ago during the Laramide Orogeny.

== Gallery ==
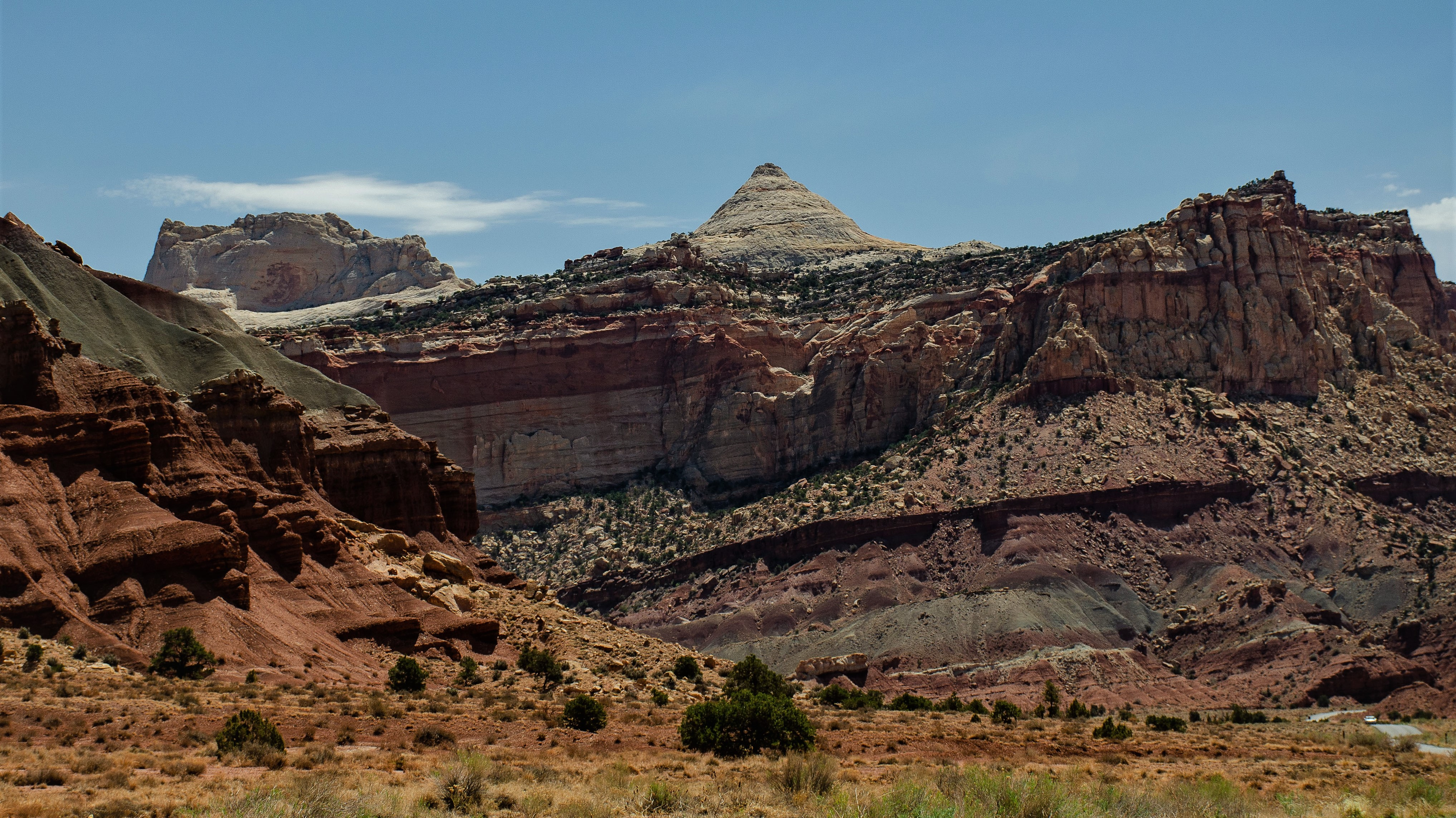
Ferns Nipple from west

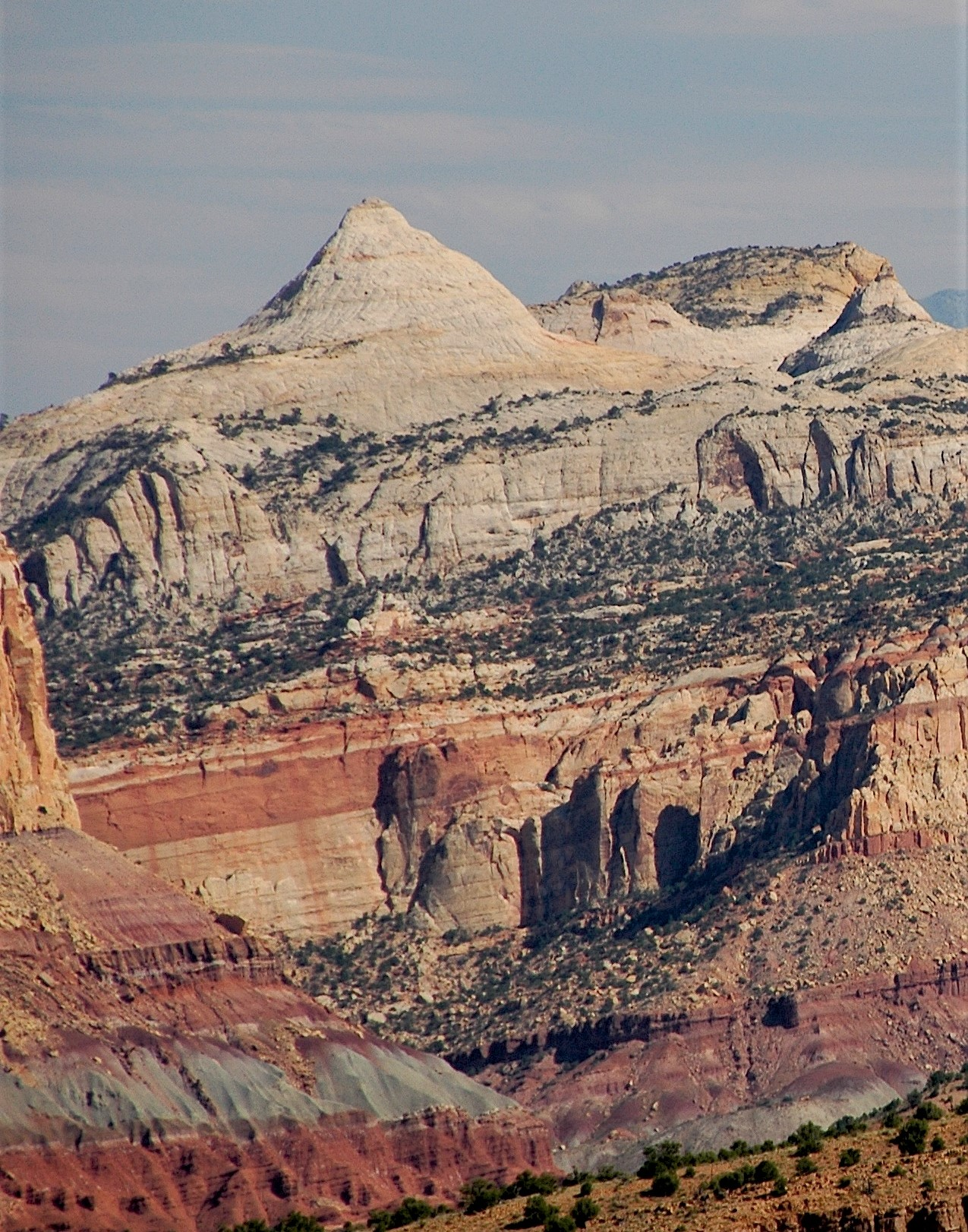
Ferns Nipple from west

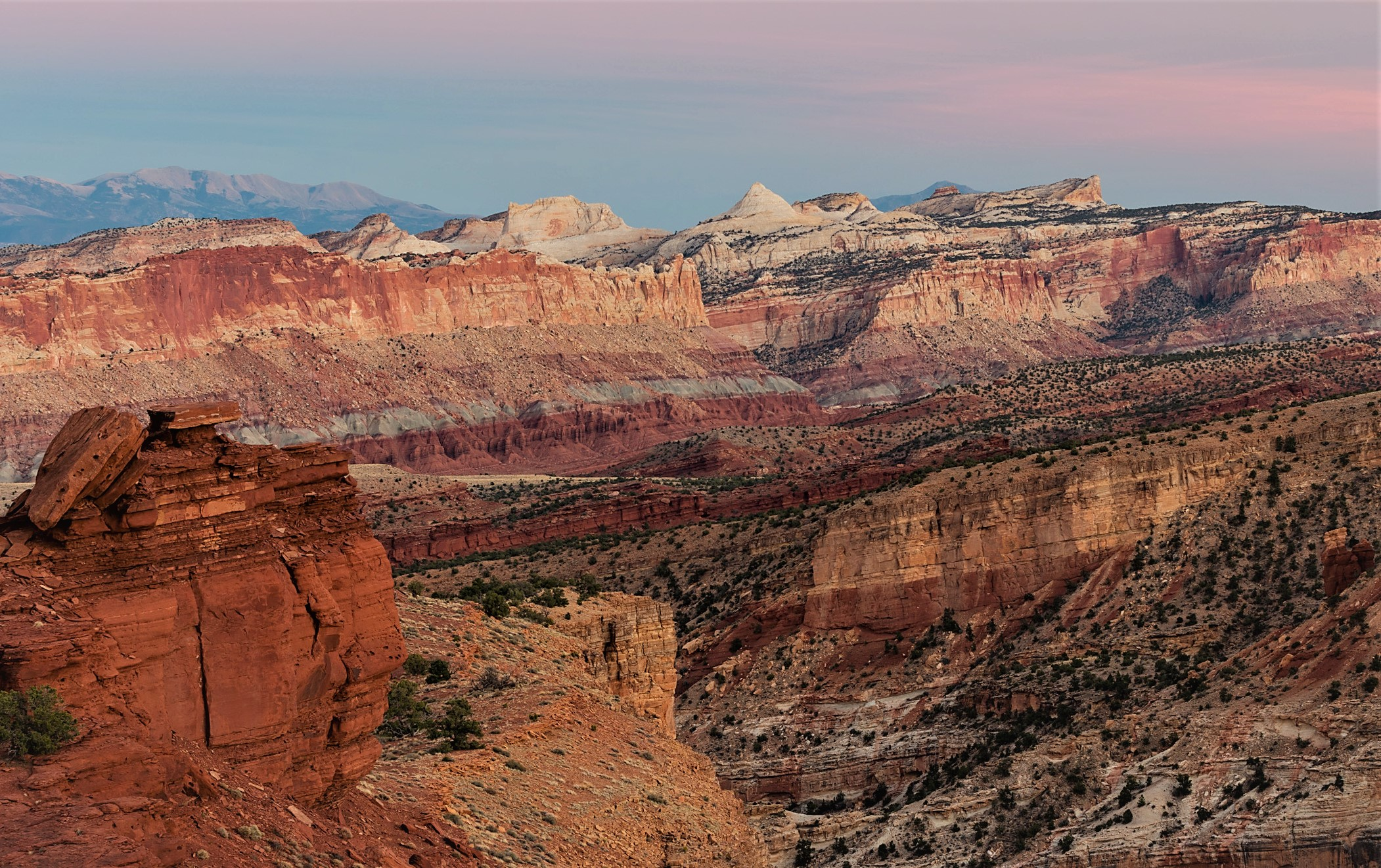
Ferns Nipple in the distance

== See also ==
- Colorado Plateau
- Geology of the Capitol Reef area
