= Hans Peter Nielson Gristmill =

- U.S. National Register of Historic Places
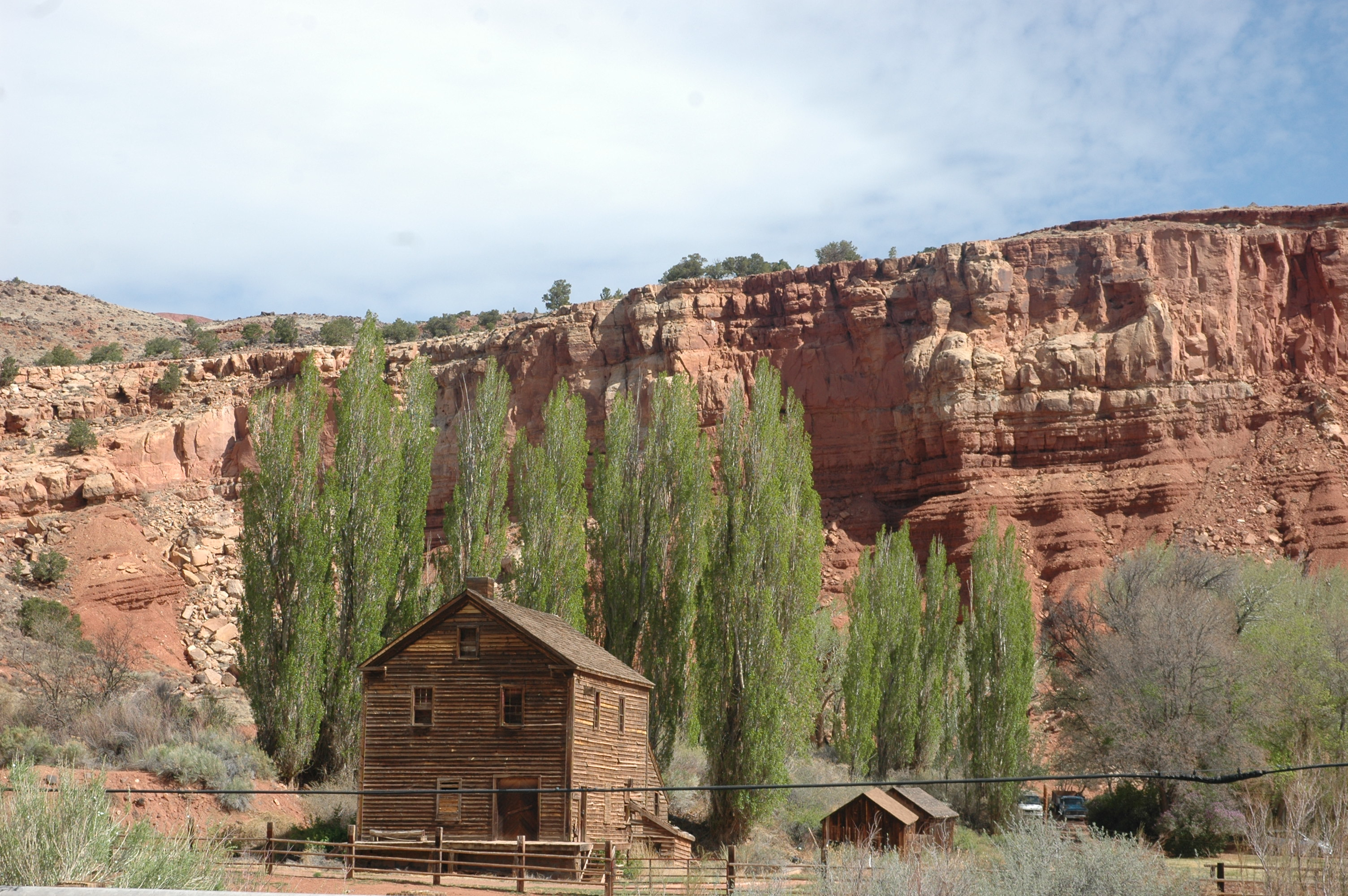

- Location within Utah
- Nearest city: Bicknell, Utah
- Coordinates: 38°18′29″N 111°30′38″W
- Area: less than one acre
- Built: 1890
- Built by: Niels Hansen
- NRHP reference No.: 75001835
- Added to NRHP: June 18, 1975

The Hans Peter Nielson Gristmill, also known as the Bicknell Gristmill, in Wayne County, Utah near Bicknell, Utah, was built around 1890. It was listed on the National Register of Historic Places in 1975.

It was built for Danish immigrant Hans Peter Nielson, a miller born in Denmark who came to Utah in 1863, and was constructed by Danish-born carpenter Niels Hansen. It was operated by Nielsen until his death in 1909, then operated by three brothers: Ernest, Jesse and Clinton Syrett, until 1921, then operated by others until 1935.

It is located about 3 miles (4.8 km) southeast of Bicknell.
