= Torrey Log Church–Schoolhouse =

Historic church in Utah, United States

- U.S. National Register of Historic Places
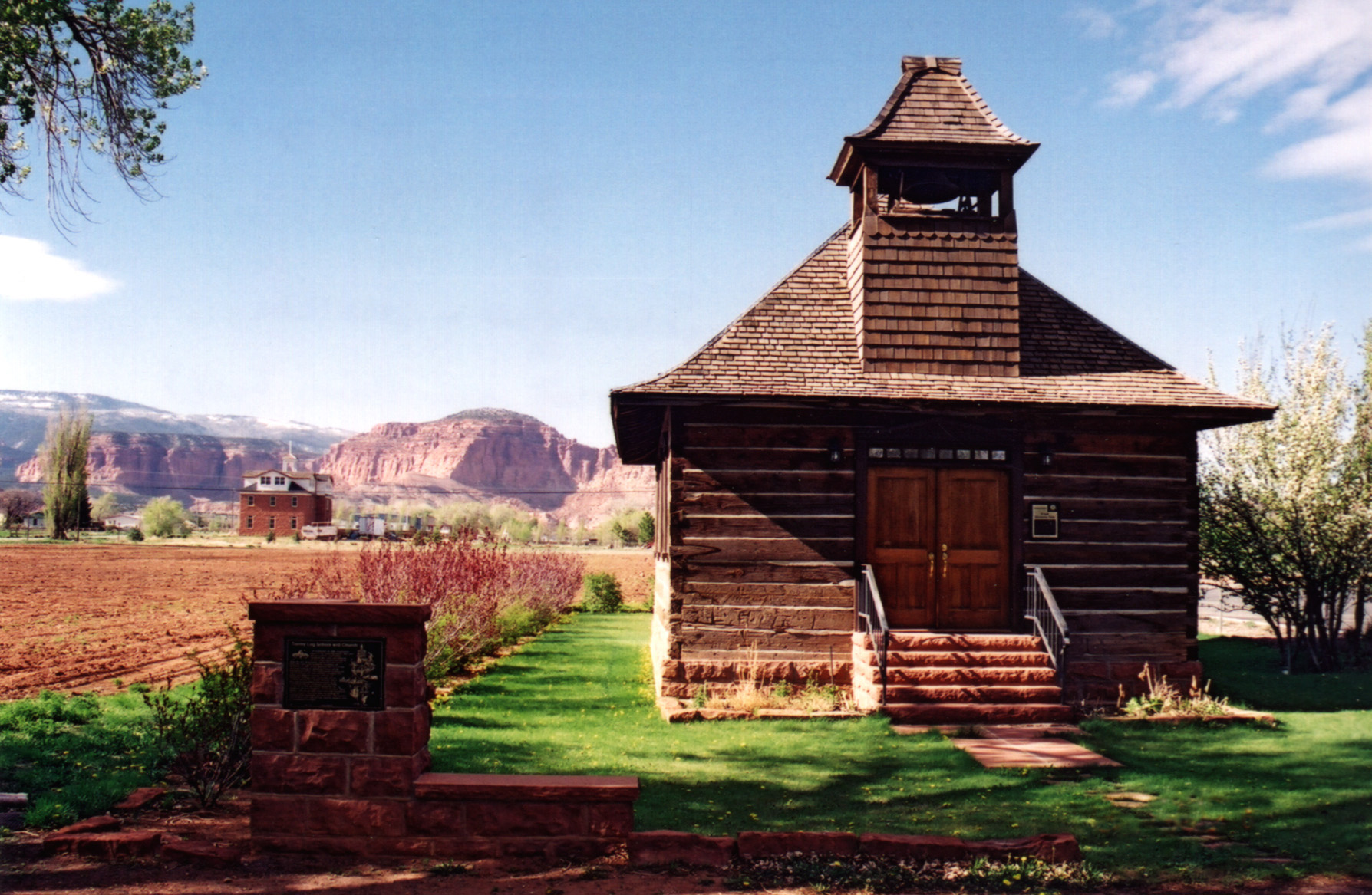

- Location within Utah Location within the United States
- Location: Approximately 49 E. Main St., Torrey, Utah
- Coordinates: 38°17′57″N 111°25′10″W
- Built: 1898
- Architect: Erickson G. Henry
- Architectural style: Greek Revival, Vernacular, log
- MPS: LDS Church Buildings in Utah MPS
- NRHP reference No.: 93000411
- Added to NRHP: May 14, 1993

The Torrey Log Church–Schoolhouse was built in Torrey, Utah in 1898 as an LDS meetinghouse and schoolhouse. The one storey log structure served as the school until 1917, and as a meetinghouse until 1928.

The single storey log building measures approximately 37 by 21 feet (11.3 by 6.4 m). The interior is a single room with an entrance on the south side and windows on the east and west sides. The windows have pedimented heads, an unusual detail in a log structure, and show a Greek Revival influence. The shingled hip roof displays a pronounced flare at the eaves and features a bell tower over the front door. The interior space is open to the rafters and is sheathed with beaded planking. Metal tie rods prevent the walls from spreading.

The building continued to be used as a meeting place for the local Daughters of Utah Pioneers (DUP) chapter until the 1970s. After an abortive project in the 1980s to renovate the building as an information station, the building was given to the DUP on the condition that it be moved off the LDS Church property. It was moved in 1991 to a temporary location, with the intention of constructing a foundation and basement. It has since been fully restored.

== See also ==
- National Register of Historic Places listings in Wayne County, Utah
