= Hanks' Dugouts =

- U.S. National Register of Historic Places
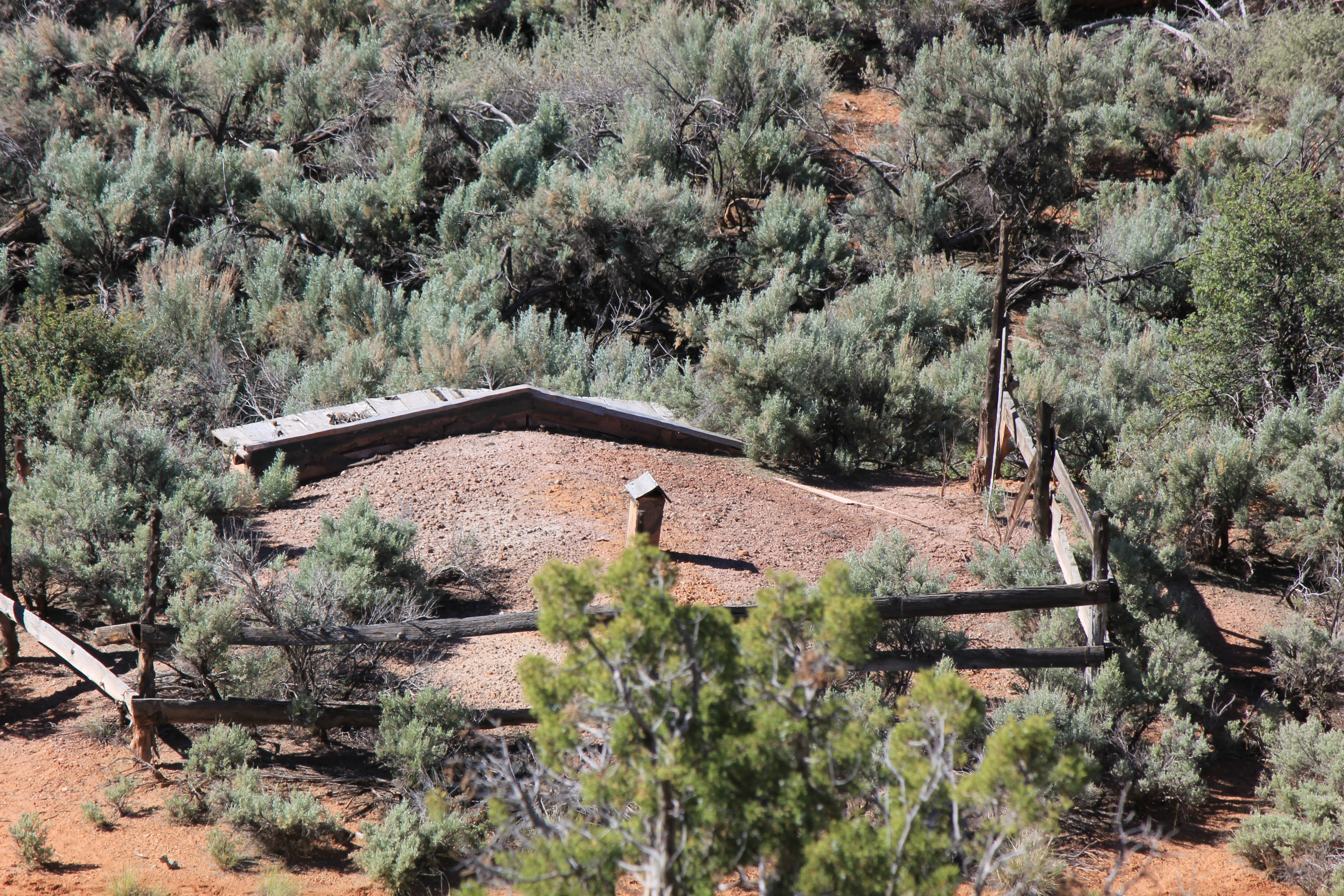

- Location within Utah Location within the United States
- Nearest city: Torrey, Utah
- Coordinates: 38°10′40″N 111°01′10″W
- Area: 1 acre (0.40 ha)
- Built: 1883
- Built by: Ephraim K. Hanks
- MPS: Capitol Reef National Park MPS
- NRHP reference No.: 99001095
- Added to NRHP: September 13, 1999

The Hanks' Dugouts are a series of pioneer dwellings in southern Utah, in what is now Capitol Reef National Park. The dugouts were constructed as temporary housing for the Ephraim K. Hanks family, Mormon pioneers who established the now-vanished Floral Ranch on Pleasant Creek in April 1883. The remains of three dugouts and one other structure remain at the site. All above-ground construction has collapsed. The dugouts were abandoned in 1888 when the Hankses built a four-room frame house, although the homestead claim of Hanks' widow claims that a one-room log house was built at the time of settlement. The site includes debris such as ceramic and glass, and pieces of a wagon. The settlement reflects a typical early Mormon homestead of the time.

The site was placed on the National Register of Historic Places on September 13, 1999.

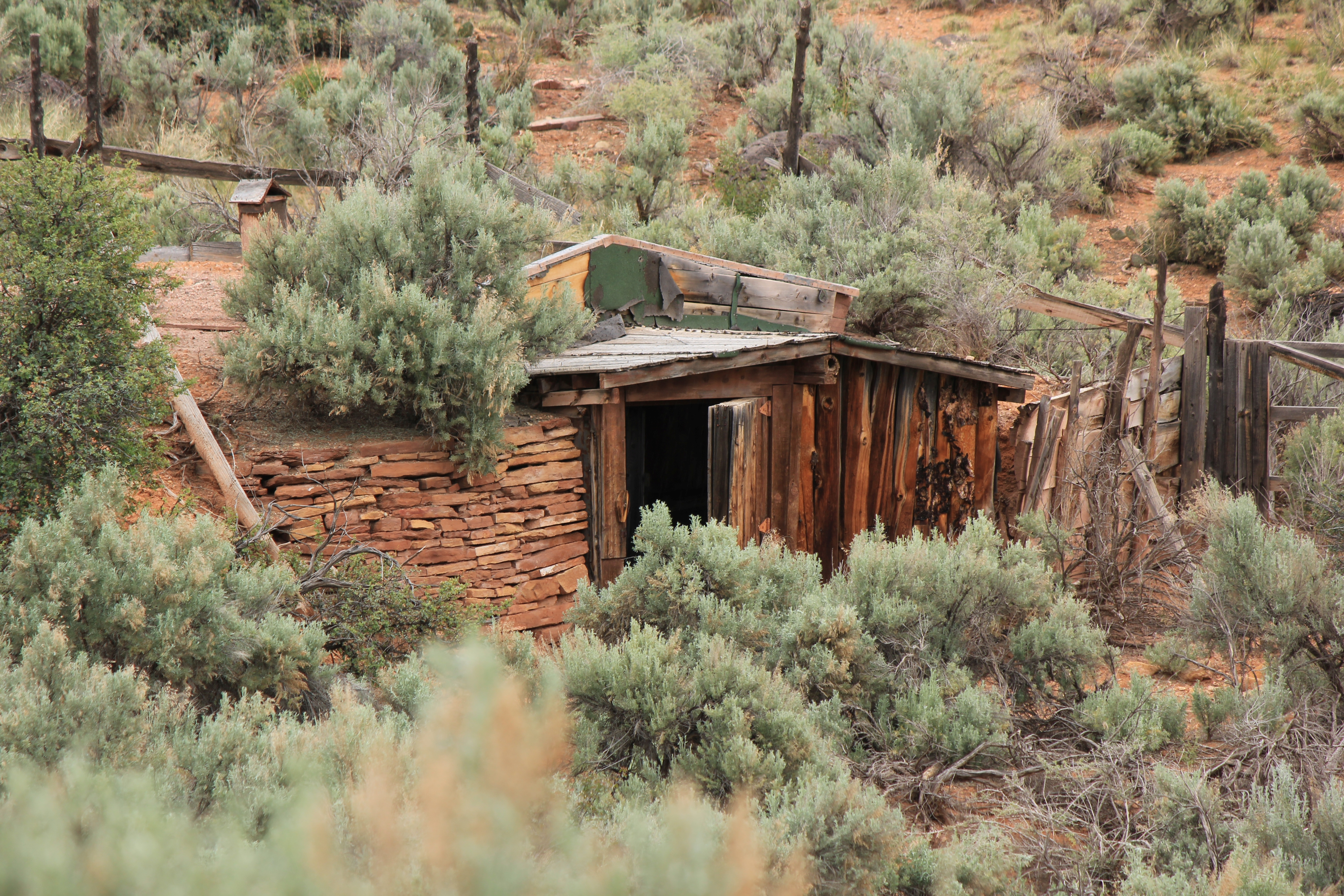
