= Fruita, Utah =

Fruita
- Ghost town
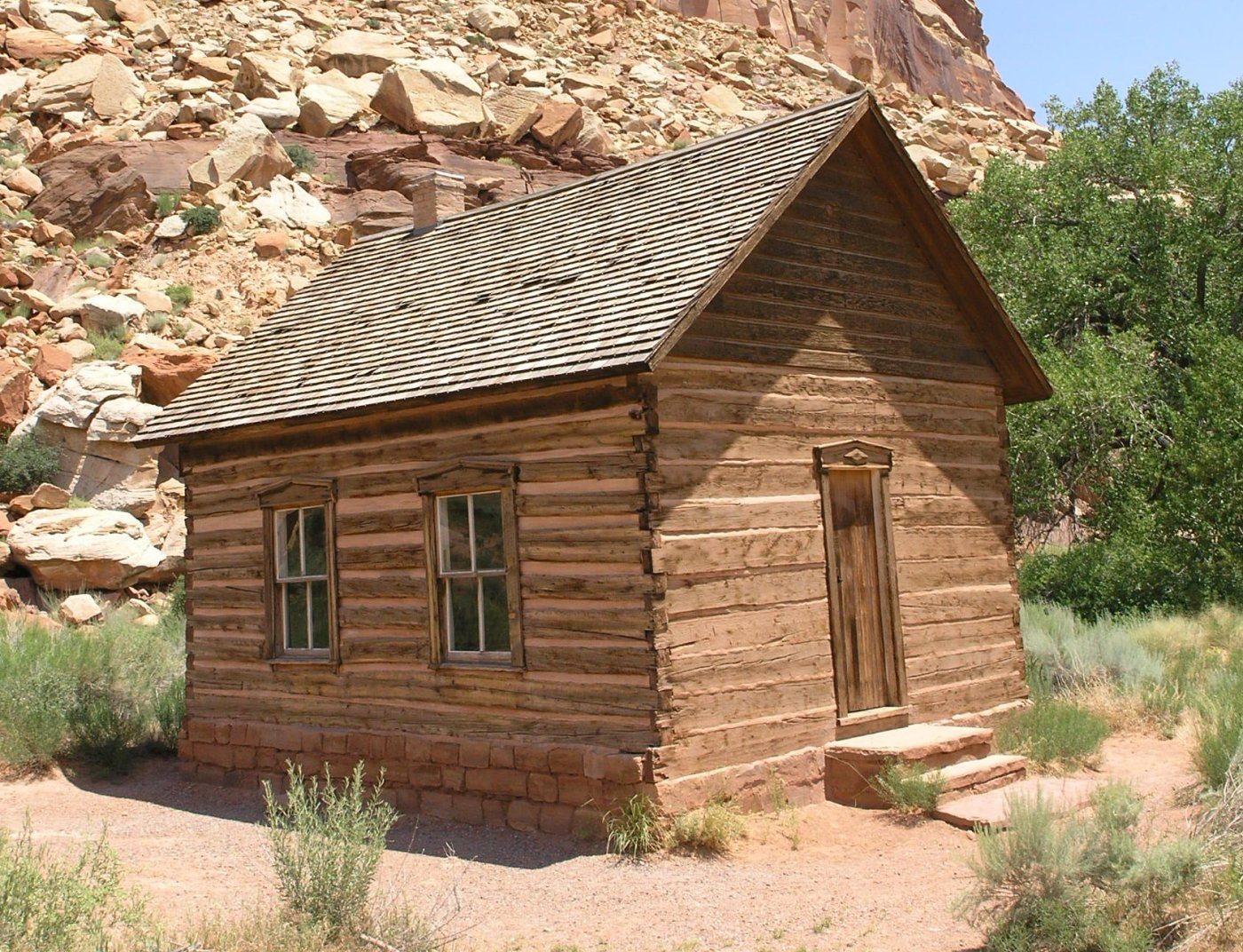
- The historic Fruita schoolhouse

- Location within Utah Location within the United States
- Coordinates: 38°17′08″N 111°14′39″W
- Country: United States
- State: Utah
- County: Wayne
- Founded: 1880
- Abandoned: 1955
- Elevation: 5,436 ft (1,657 m)
- GNIS feature ID: 1441249

Fruita is the best-known settlement in Capitol Reef National Park in Wayne County, Utah, United States. It is located at the confluence of Fremont River and Sulphur Creek. Despite its status as ghost town, it is the location of the National Park Service's employee residences.

== History ==
Fruita was established in 1880 by a group of Mormons led by Nels Johnson, under the name Junction. The town became known as Fruita in 1902 or 1904. In 1900, Fruita was named The Eden of Wayne County for its large orchards. Fruita was abandoned in 1955 when the National Park Service purchased the town to be included in Capitol Reef National Park.

Today few buildings remain, except for the restored schoolhouse and the Gifford house and barn. The orchards remain, now under the ownership of the National Park Service, and have about 2,500 trees. The orchards are preserved by the NPS as a "historic landscape" and a small crew takes care of them by pruning, irrigating, replanting, and spraying them.

The one-room schoolhouse was built and opened in 1896. The few students were instructed mainly in reading, writing, and arithmetic, but when the teachers were capable, they also studied other subjects such as history or geography. The room was also used for balls and religious services. It was renovated in 1966 by the National Park Service.

Fruita is currently the heart and administrative center of Capitol Reef National Park.

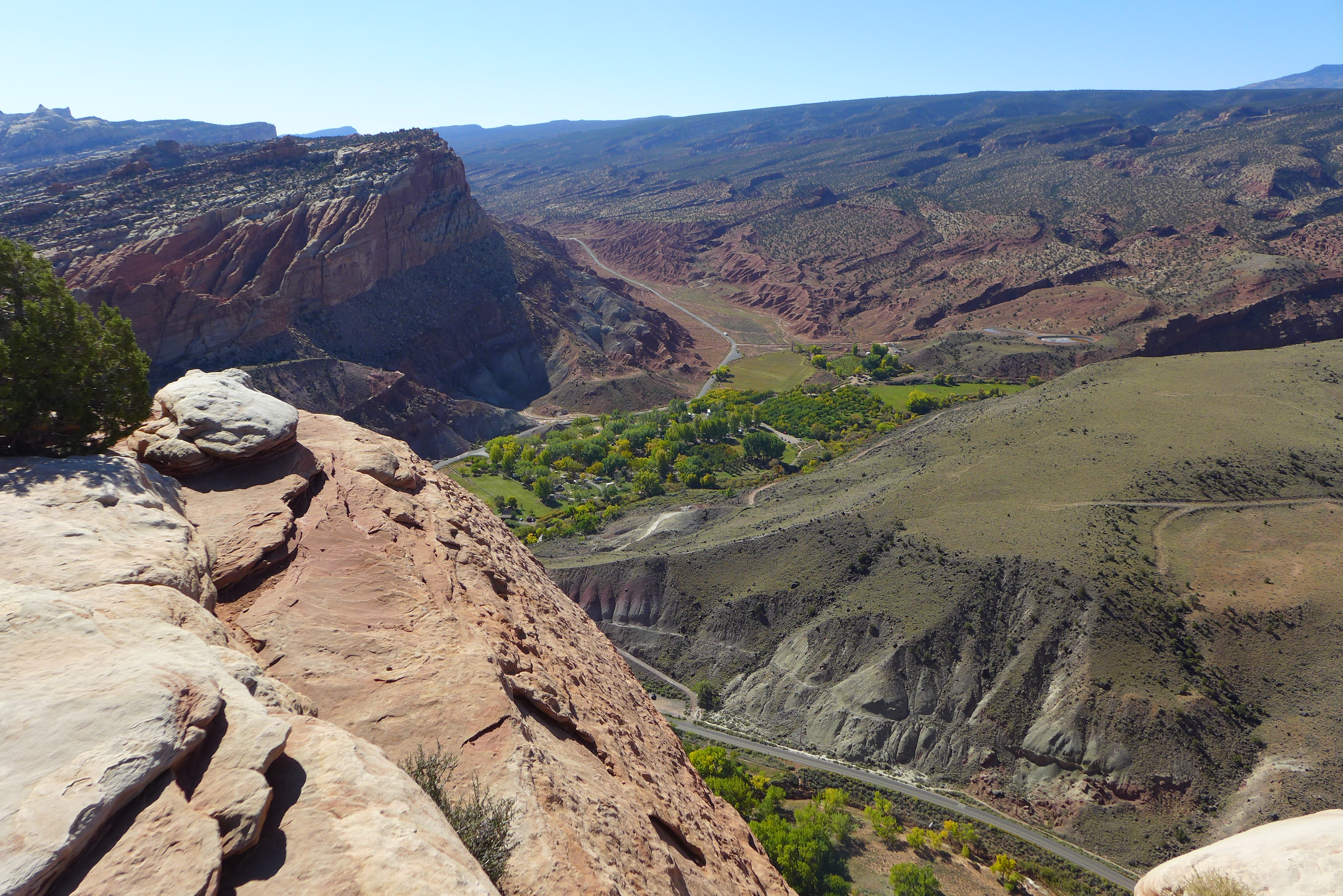
View from canyon's edge

== Popular culture ==
- Used as the setting for Western Five Bloody Graves 1970, according to DVD audio commentary.

== Climate ==
According to the Köppen Climate Classification system, Fruita has a semi-arid climate, abbreviated "BSk" on climate maps.

== See also ==
- Fruita Schoolhouse
