= Geology of Utah =

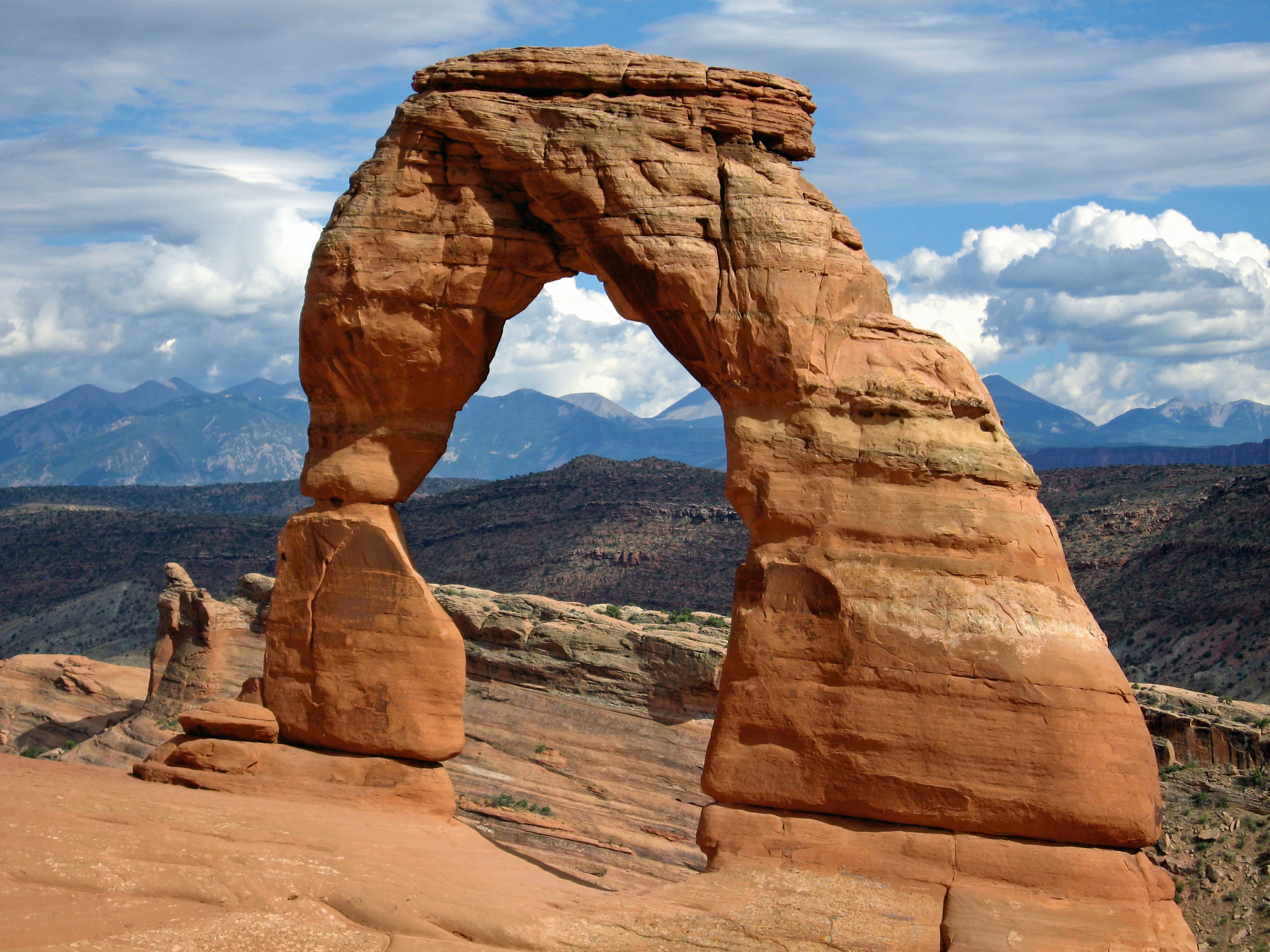
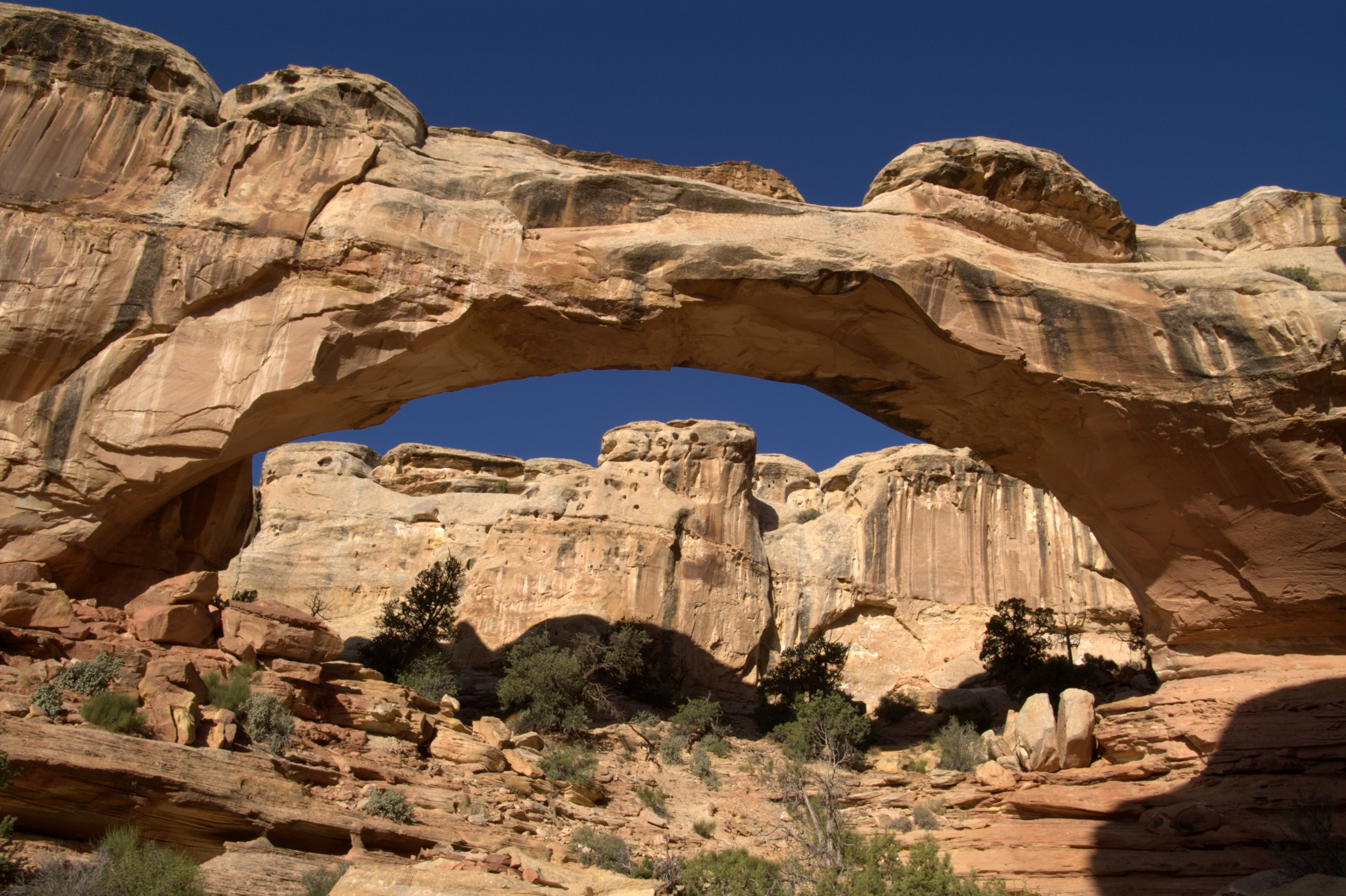
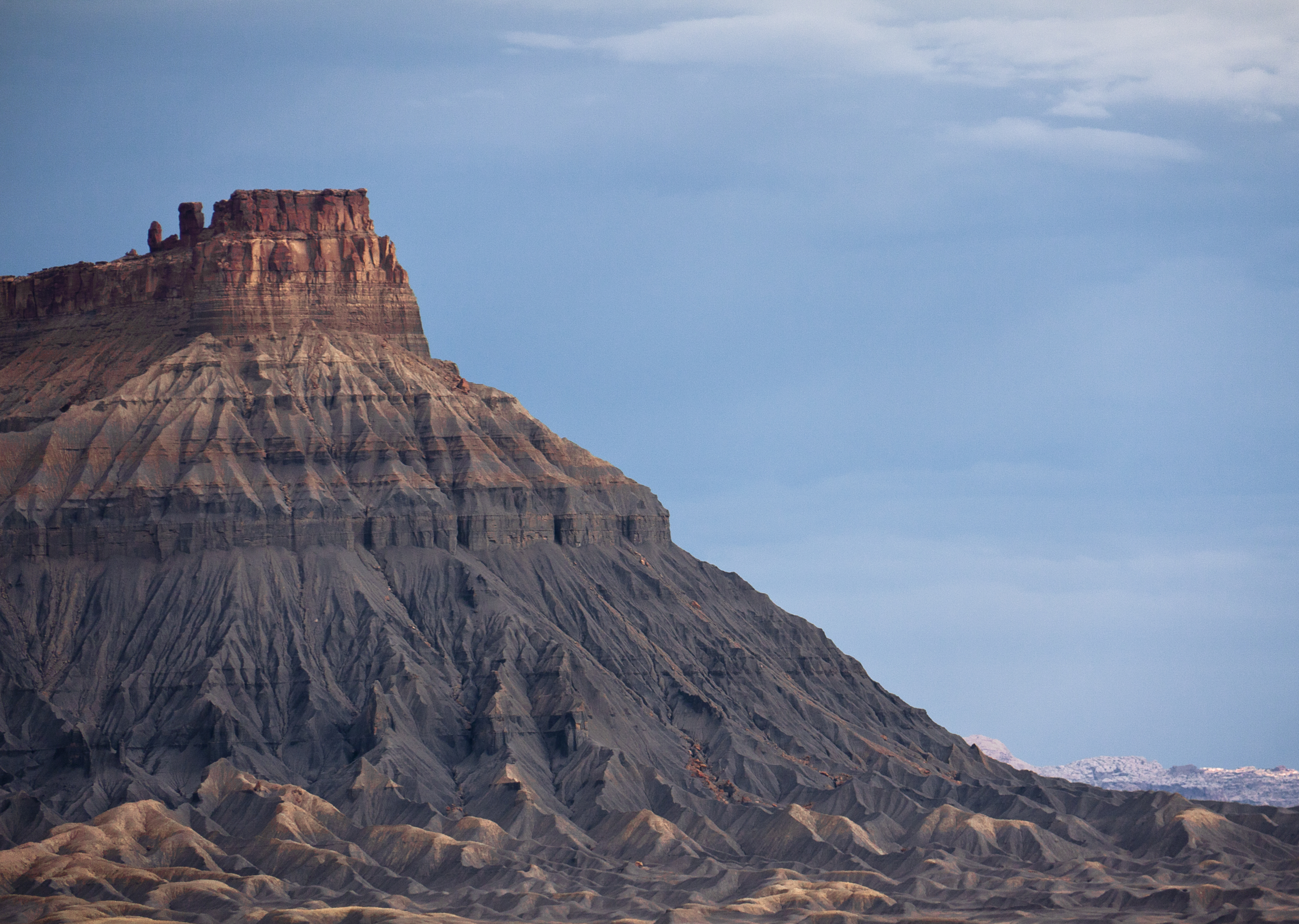
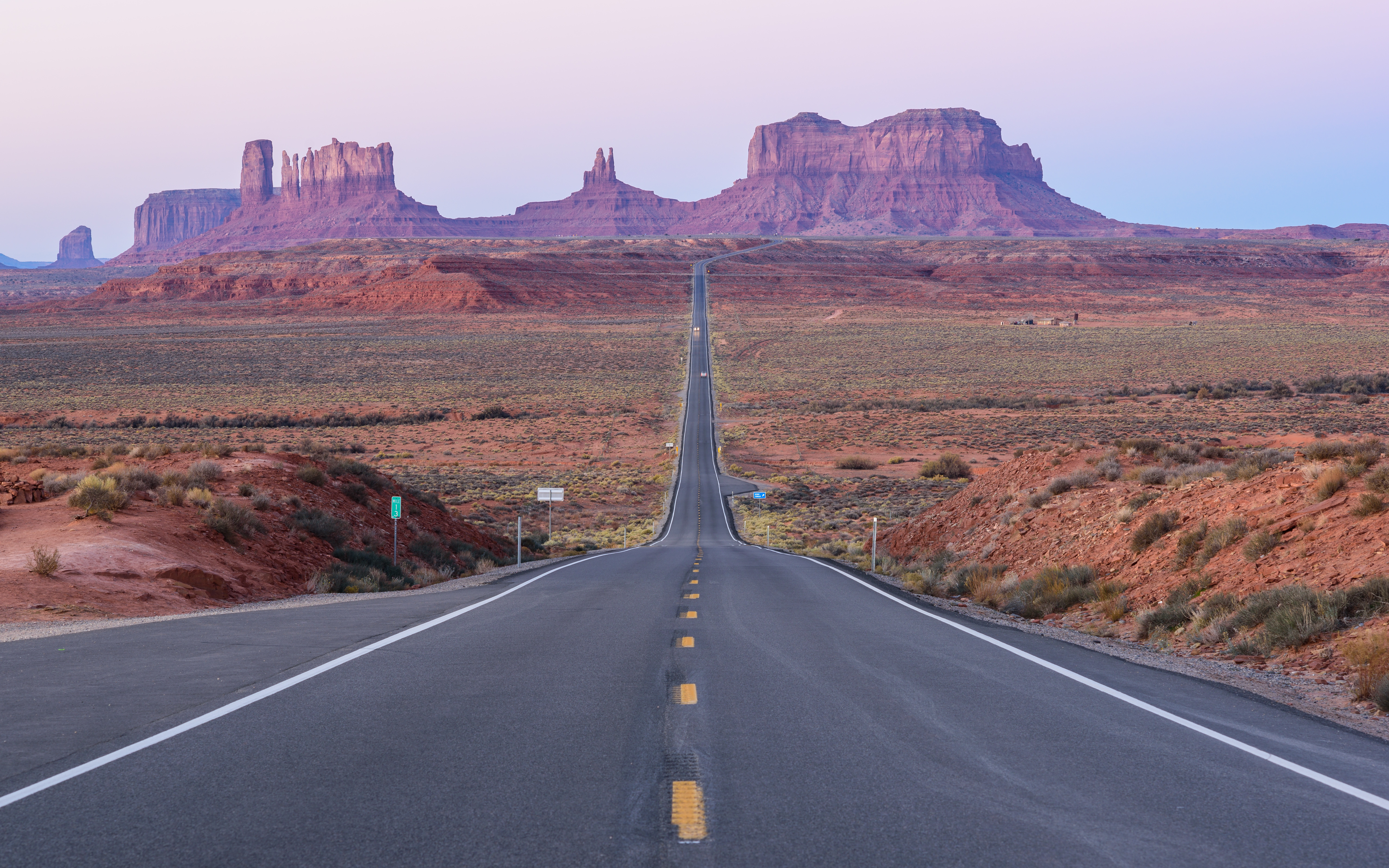
Clockwise from upper left: Delicate Arch, Hickman Natural Bridge, Caineville Reef, Monument Valley

The geology of Utah, in the western United States, includes rocks formed at the edge of the proto-North American continent during the Precambrian. A shallow marine sedimentary environment covered the region for much of the Paleozoic and Mesozoic, followed by dryland conditions, volcanism, and the formation of the basin and range terrain in the Cenozoic.

== Geologic history ==
The eastern Uinta Mountains near the Colorado line and the Raft River-Dove Creek Mountains contain the oldest rocks in Utah from more than two billion years ago. Rubidium-strontium dating of the Red Creek quartzite in 1965 indicated an age of 2.3 billion years. Other geologists found 2.4 billion-year-old schist and gneiss in the Albion Range Green Creek Complex. Prior to the 1960s, geologists inferred the Vishnu and Farmington Canyon gneiss and schist as Archean in age, but subsequent research indicated a formation between 1.6 and 1.5 billion years ago in the Proterozoic. From 1.75 to 1.65 billion years ago, Utah was impacted by the Mazatzal orogeny. Thick sequences of sedimentary rock from the Neoproterozoic, including tillite, underlie much of the state.

=== Paleozoic (541–251 million years ago) ===
Utah has numerous rocks deposited during the Paleozoic, as multicellular life diversified for the first time. Basal Cambrian quartzite, up to 4,000 feet (1,200 m) thick, is sometimes difficult to distinguish from Precambrian rocks. A shallow marine environment produced mottled limestone and stromatalite beds, deepening to the west. Thin shale and siltstone units of the Whirlwind Formation likely originated from sediment sources in the east. The Pioche Shale contains some of the oldest Cambrian fossils, followed by a continuous sequence of trilobite fossils in the House Range.

In eastern Utah, which rests on the craton of the proto-North American continent Laurentia, there are no Ordovician deposits, but Early Ordovician clastic limestone, Middle Ordovician quartz sandstone, and Late Ordovician dolomite is common in the west. Geologists have found intraformational limestone from the Early Ordovician, originating as limestone forming in a tidal bed is redeposited as pebbles in situ. Brachiopod, trilobite, and echinoderm fossils are common in these rocks. Middle Ordovician quartzites form distinctive orange, brown, and pink cliffs above gray limestone slopes, set beneath black dolomite cliffs in the north and west. Chert-rich dolomite cliffs form in the most widespread Ordovician unit: the Fish Haven-Ely Springs Dolomite.

Only a single stratigraphic unit—the Laketown Dolomite—formed during the Silurian, far from sediment sources in a carbonate platform environment, with few distinct fossil assemblages. Although thickest in the west, Devonian strata are present in the east, unlike Ordovician and Silurian rocks. A local orogeny produced the Stansbury Uplift, leading to downward erosion into older rock units dating to the Precambrian and the deposition of the coarse conglomerate Stansbury Formation. Shale and quartz sandstone are often interbedded with carbonates, as in the Hanauer Formation in the Thomas-Dugway Range.

In the Mississippian, up to 6,000 feet (1,800 m) of sediment accumulated in the Oquirrh Basin. Marine deposition was continuous, with numerous fossils in an unbroken record, such as the crinoid stems, brachiopods, and corals in the Chainman-Manning Canyon Shale. Silicified brachiopod and coral fossils mark the Redwall, Leadville, Madison, Gardison, Joana, and Lodgepole limestones, and only the northwest lacks extensive limestone formations.

Geologists focused significant attention on the Pennsylvanian rocks of the Paradox Formation in the Paradox Basin after the discovery of oil, potash, and rock salt. The basin took shape as part of the Uncompahgre Uplift, produced by the uplift of the ancestral Rocky Mountains. Several thousand feet of salt accumulated beneath arkose shed off the mountains. Up to 13,000 feet of sedimentary rocks accumulated in the Oquirrh Basin.

A small unconformity separates these rocks from those formed in the Permian. These rocks tend to be difficult to correlate, with significant lateral variation, cross-bedded sandstones indicating wing transportation, and a lack of late-Permian rocks. A major marine transgression generated the Kaibab Limestone (the rimrock of the Grand Canyon), represented by the Park City and Phosphoria groups in Utah.

=== Mesozoic (251–66 million years ago) ===
In the early Mesozoic, one final marine deposit formed in western Utah during the Triassic—the Thaynes Limestone—before the region was uplifted. The early-Triassic Moenkopi Formation is a mudstone with thin layers of limestone formed as the sea spread out across mud flats and hosts the Canyonlands in southern Utah. From east to west, mudstone grades into limestone.

The Navajo, Wingate, and Kayenta sandstones are distinguished by the cross-bedding of the Kayenta Sandstone across the Colorado Plateau, which tends to be more characteristic of a stream environment than the sand dune deposits that make up the Wingate Sandstone. The Navajo Sandstone began to form in the late Triassic but is mainly a Jurassic formation, including the formations in Zion National Park. Other important Jurassic units include the Entrada Sandstone, which hosts Arches National Park, and the Morrison Formation, with notable fossils preserved at Dinosaur National Monument. The thickest Jurassic sediments are between Devil's Slide, east of Ogden and Marysvale, which include gypsum and other evaporites, mined from the Arapien Shale. The Sevier orogeny to the west shed gravel and other sediments into the Morrison Formation. The formation was entirely continental in origin, recording shallow lakes, shifting streams, and volcanic ash. A shallow seaway formed in the Middle Jurassic, leaving behind the fossil-bearing Carmel and Twin Creek formations.

The last time Utah was covered by shallow seas was during the Cretaceous. The continued uplifting during the Sevier orogeny led to erosion. The Kelvin and Lower Indianola formations indicate continuous sand and gravel deposition in streams along the foothills of the mountains, while both the Burro Canyon and Cedar Mountain formations (which are rich in fossils) point to floodplain deposits similar to those in the underlying Morrison Formation. Near the Wyoming line, the Dakota Sandstone is overlain by the Aspen-Mowry Shale. In the Wasatch Plateau, the Ferron Sandstone represents a brief marine regression to the east and serves as an important natural gas horizon. The Emery and Mesaverde sandstones indicate similar regressions (the Mesaverde marks the last one in the late Cretaceous). Coals formed in units, such as the Straight Cliffs Formation.

=== Cenozoic (66 million years ago–present) ===
In the Cenozoic, the Laramide orogeny uplifted the Rocky Mountains. Near Flaming Gorge, the Paleocene Fort Union Formation angularly overlies the Cretaceous Ericson Sandstone, while on the south slope of the Uinta Mountains, the Wasatch Formation overlies the Cretaceous Mesaverde Sandstone. The Wasatch Conglomerate formed as the coarsest debris accumulated in basins near the uplifted areas, with sediments growing finer further east and reaching up to 13,000 feet thick through the Eocene in the Uinta Basin. Large lakes played an important role as well. Paleocene Lake Flagstaff left algal limestone in the Southern Wasatch Mountains, along with marl-mudstone in Bryce Canyon, Cedar Breaks, and Richfield. Eocene Lake Green River deposits do not extend as far south but include an important oil shale resource. Erosion wore down the Uinta Mountains enough that the Duchesne River Formation covered over earlier Cenozoic basin fill.

An abrupt shift to volcanic activity in the Needle Range and at Marysvale, Crystal Peak, Tintic, and Bingham took place in the Oligocene, erupting with thick ash flow tuff and producing welded ignimbrite. The Needle Range ash flow tuff is the most extensive, covering 13,000 square miles in southwest Utah and eastern Nevada. While most tuffs are rhyolite, the Needle Range tuff includes amphibolite, biotite, and plagioclase phenocrysts. Volcanism was related to the subducting Farallon Plate and took place from 35 to 19 million years ago, predating the block faulting of the Basin and Range Province, making tuff useful for stratigraphic comparisons. Several unusual laccolith intrusions formed, including the Henry, La Sal, Abajo, and Three Peaks mountains. Volcanic activity lessened from 19 to 16 million years ago, followed by basalt flows, cinder cones, and the Topaz-Spor Mountain rhyolite into the Miocene, Pliocene, and Quaternary. During this time and continuing to the present, block faulting created the basin and range terrain in western Utah and Nevada.

Lake Bonneville formed during the Quaternary, covering 20,000 square miles. The Great Salt Lake is the remnant of the deepest part of the lake, where the depth was once as much as 1,000 feet (300 m). During the Pleistocene, glaciers formed in the mountains, and in the case of the Temple Lake Stade and Gannett Peak Stade, advanced 4,000 years ago in the Holocene.

== Regional features ==
Utah is divided into several distinct regions based on tectonic and stratigraphic trends. These regions include: the Colorado Plateau, Uinta Mountains, Uinta Basin, Basin and Range Province, and the Central Utah Thrust Belt, among others.

=== Central Utah Thrust Belt ===
The Central Utah Thrust Belt runs north to south across Utah and is a remnant segment of the continent-scale Sevier orogeny. This mountain belt formed from 50–160– million years ago due to subduction of the Farallon oceanic crust under the North American Plate. The Central Utah Thrust Belt can be divided into smaller thrust sheet segments, including the Charleston-Nebo Thrust Salient, the Emery Uplift, and the Gunnison-Paxton Segment.

This region has been the focus of 21st-century petroleum exploration. In 2004, a well struck oil in what is now the Covenant Oil Field, 3 km south of Sigurd. As of 2020, 27 million barrels had been produced from this field, from 34 production wells, averaging 3,400 barrels per day.
