= Pectols Pyramid =

Summit in Utah, United States

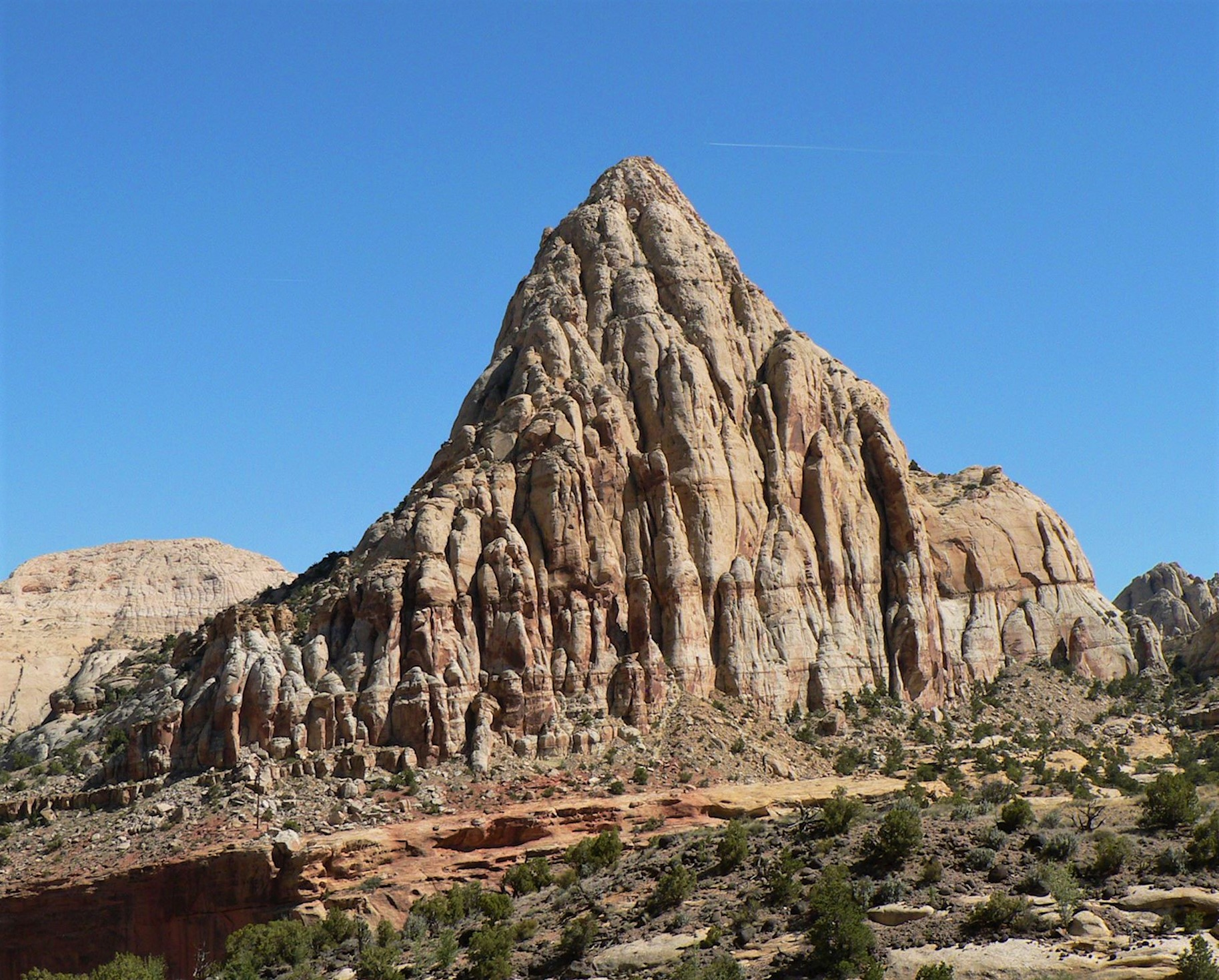
- Northwest aspect

Highest point
- Elevation: 6,211 ft (1,893 m)
- Prominence: 407 ft (124 m)
- Isolation: 0.91 mi (1.46 km)
- Coordinates: 38°17′07″N 111°13′36″W

Geography
- Location within Utah Location within the United States
- Country: United States
- State: Utah
- County: Wayne
- Protected area: Capitol Reef National Park
- Parent range: Colorado Plateau
- Topo map: USGS Fruita

Geology
- Rock age: Jurassic
- Rock type: Navajo Sandstone

Pectols Pyramid is a 6,211-foot (1,893-meter) elevation summit located in Capitol Reef National Park, in Wayne County of Utah, United States. This iconic landmark is situated two miles (3.2 km) southeast of the park's visitor center, one mile (1.6 km) south of Navajo Dome, and 0.5 mi (0.80 km) southwest of Capitol Dome. Precipitation runoff from this feature is drained by the Fremont River, which in turn is within the Colorado River drainage basin. This geological feature's name honors Ephraim Portman Pectol (1875–1947), booster and founder of what would become Capitol Reef National Monument in 1937.

== Geology ==
Pectols Pyramid is composed of Navajo Sandstone, which is believed to have formed about 180 million years ago as a giant sand sea, the largest in Earth's history. In a hot, dry climate, wind blew over sand dunes, creating large, sweeping crossbeds which date to the Jurassic. Long after the sedimentary rocks were deposited, the Colorado Plateau was uplifted relatively evenly, keeping the layers roughly horizontal, but Capitol Reef is an exception because of the Waterpocket Fold, a classic monocline, which formed between 50 and 70 million years ago during the Laramide Orogeny.

== Gallery ==
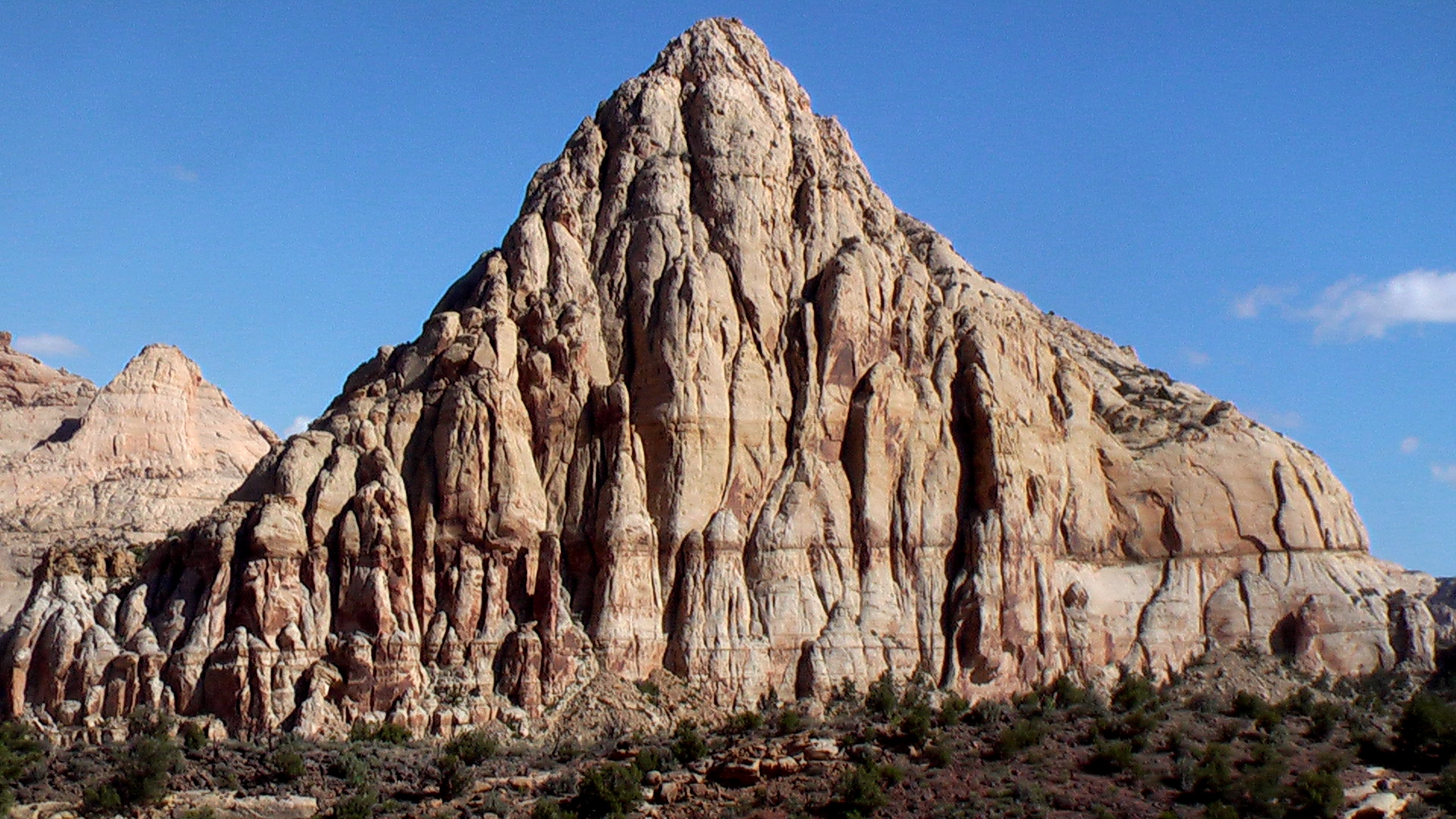
Northwest aspect

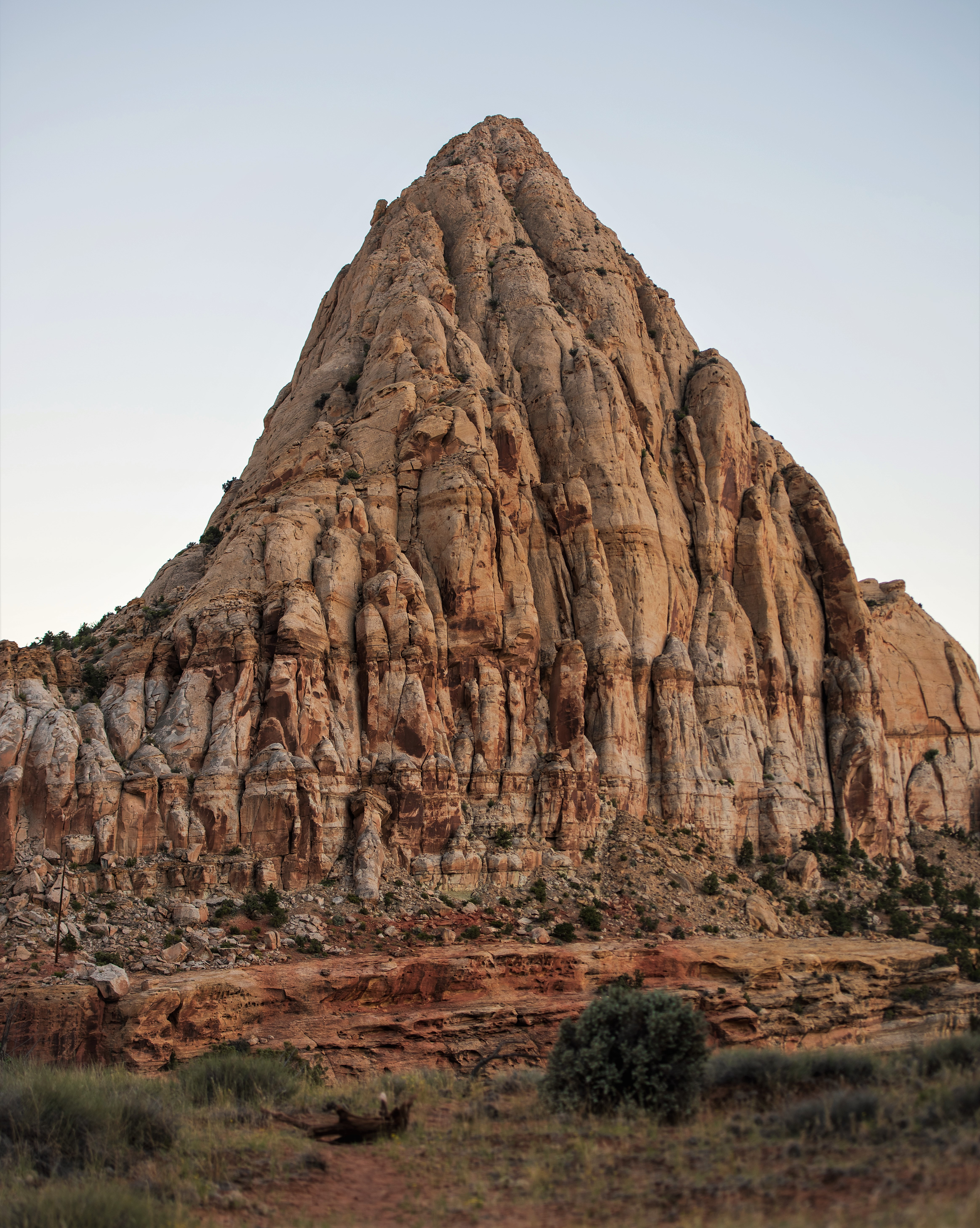

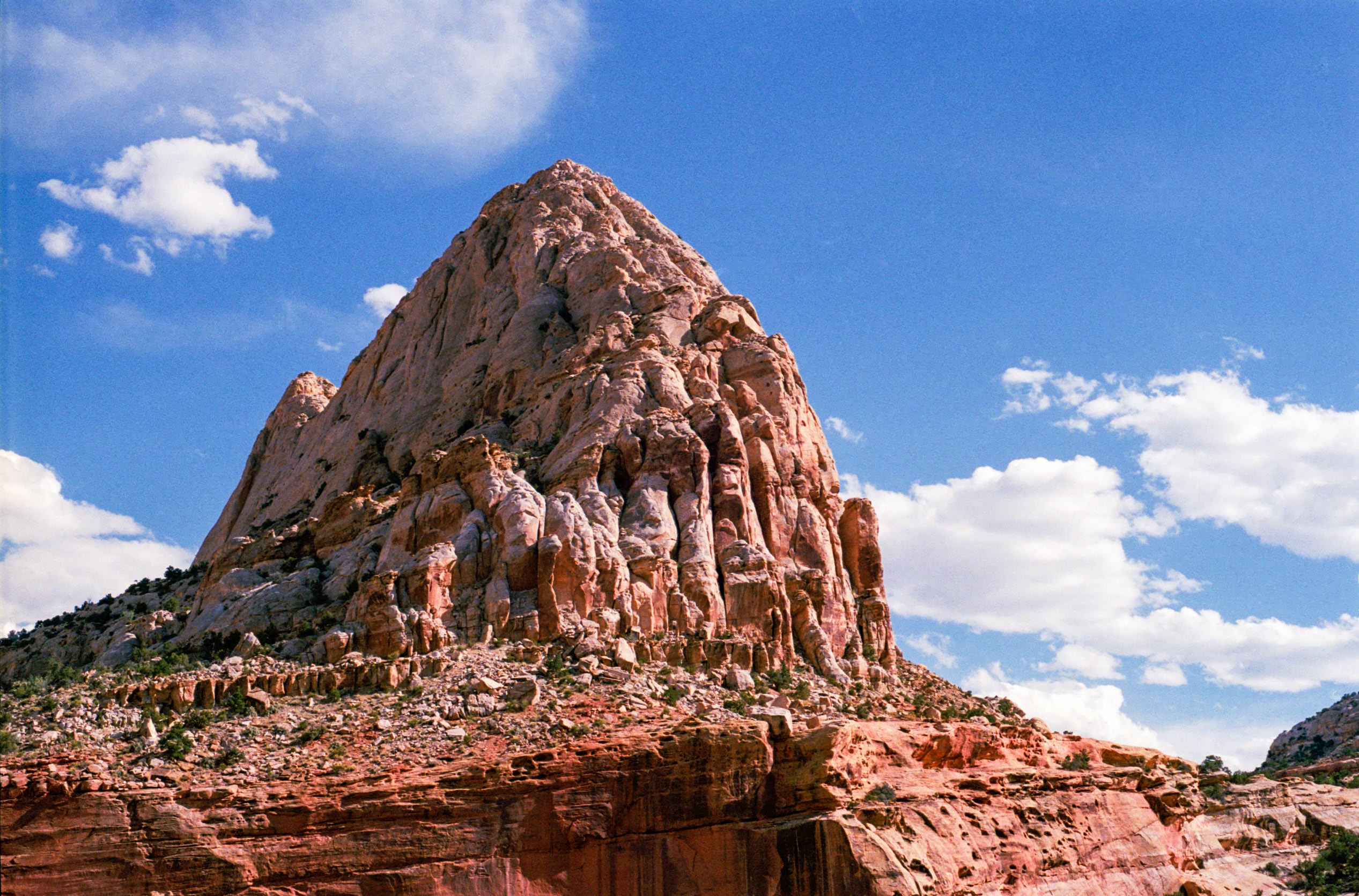
North aspect

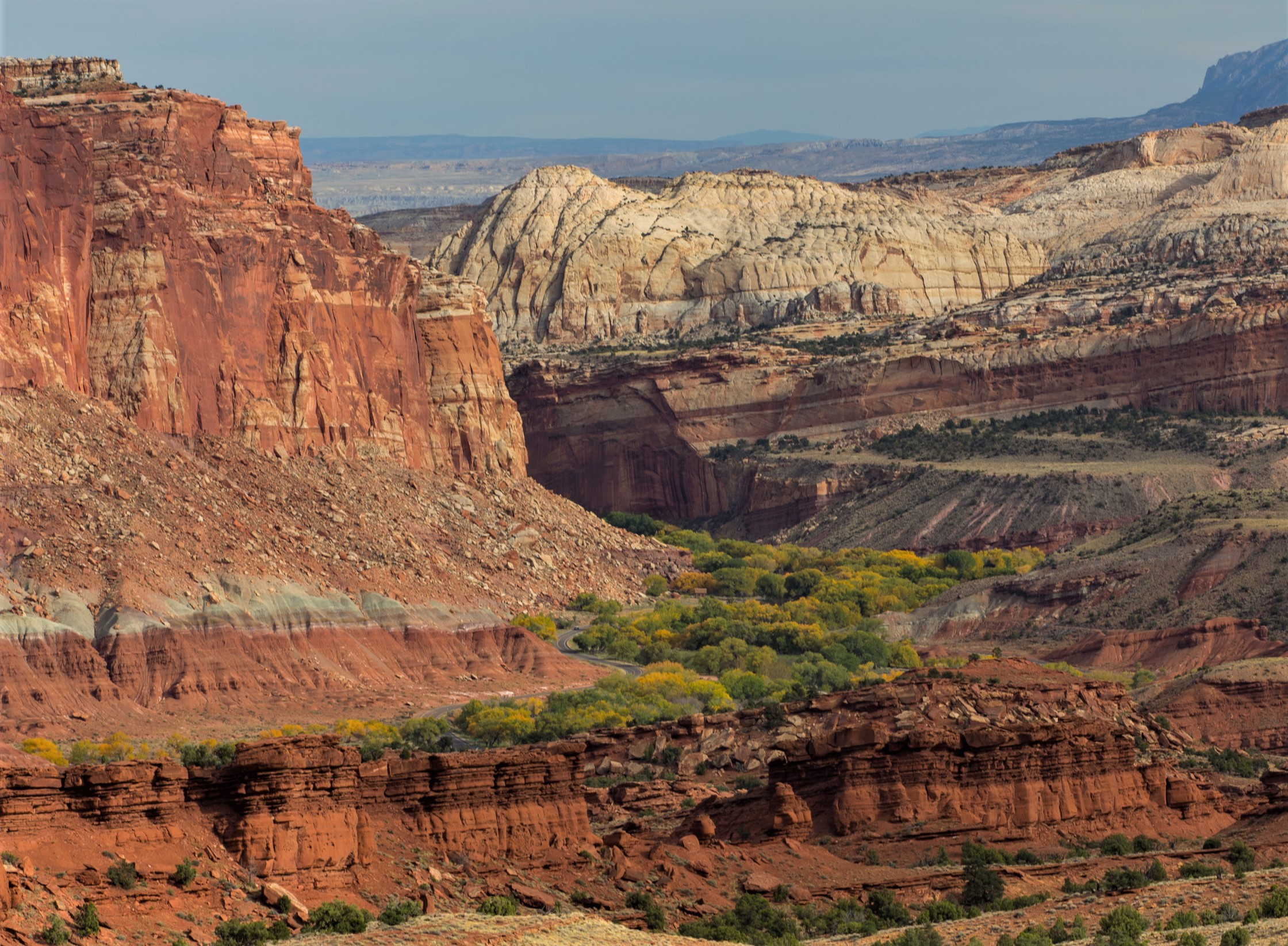
The distant white Pectols Pyramid centered, west aspect

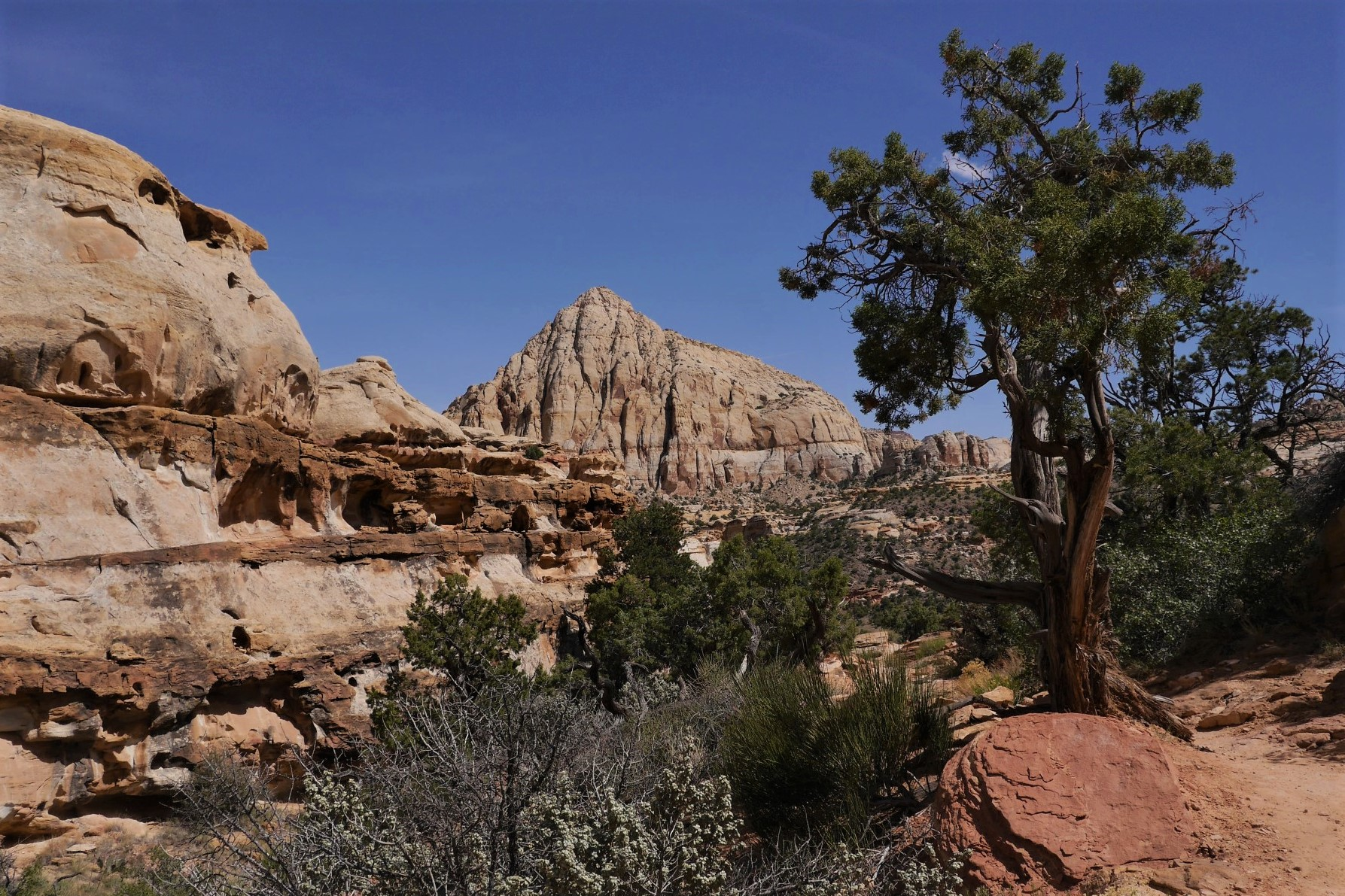
Pectols Pyramid seen from Hickman Bridge Trail

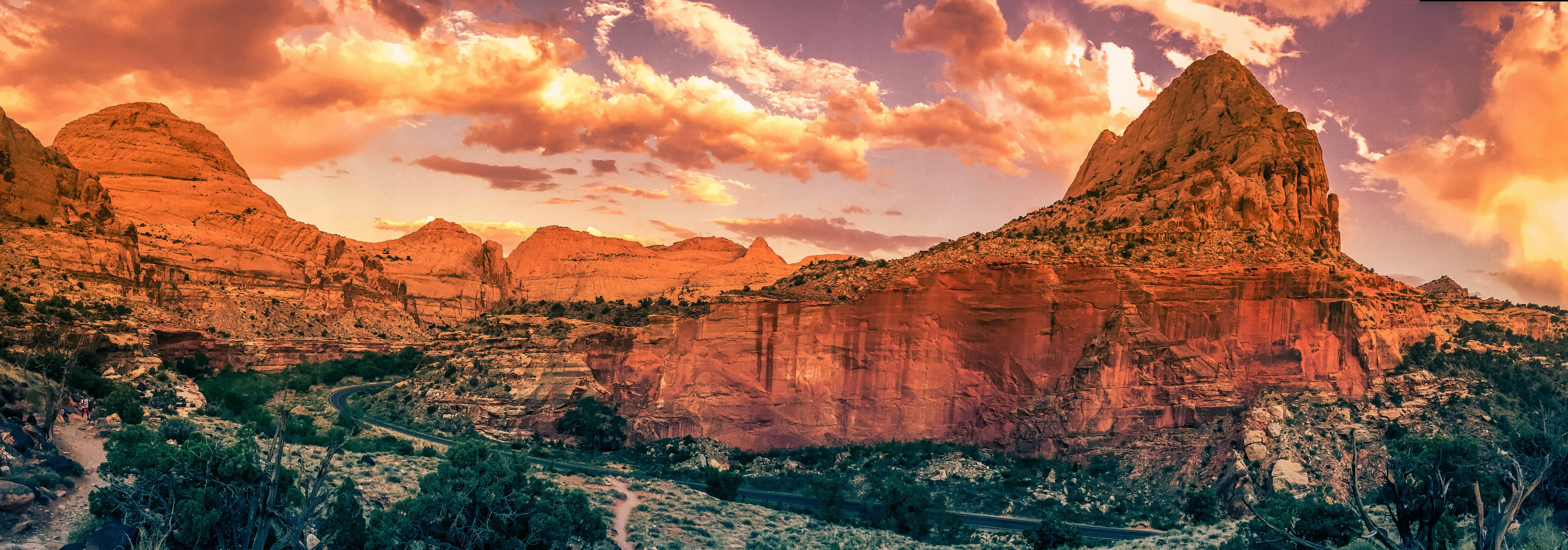
Capitol Dome (left), Pectols Pyramid (right)

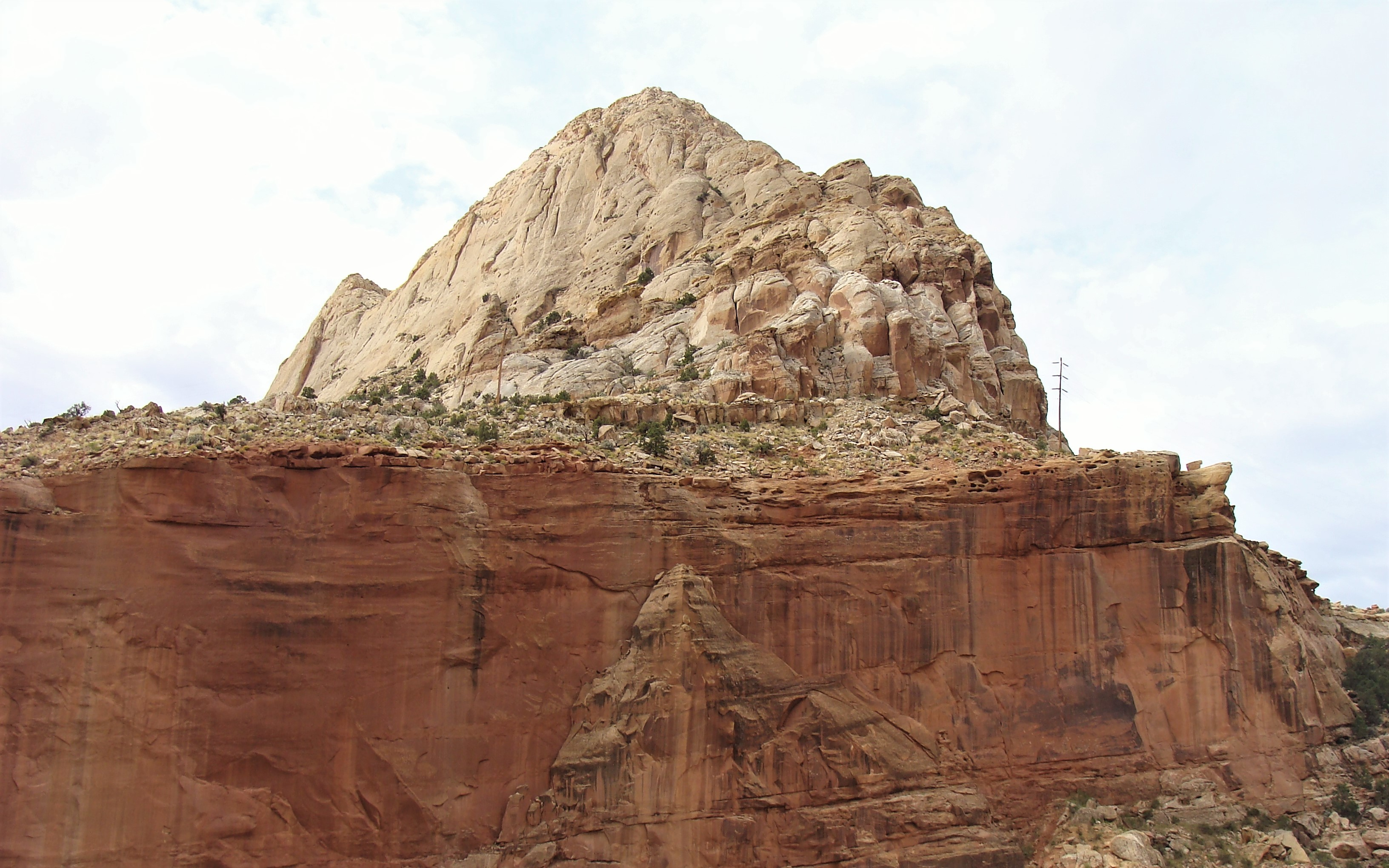
Pectols Pyramid from north

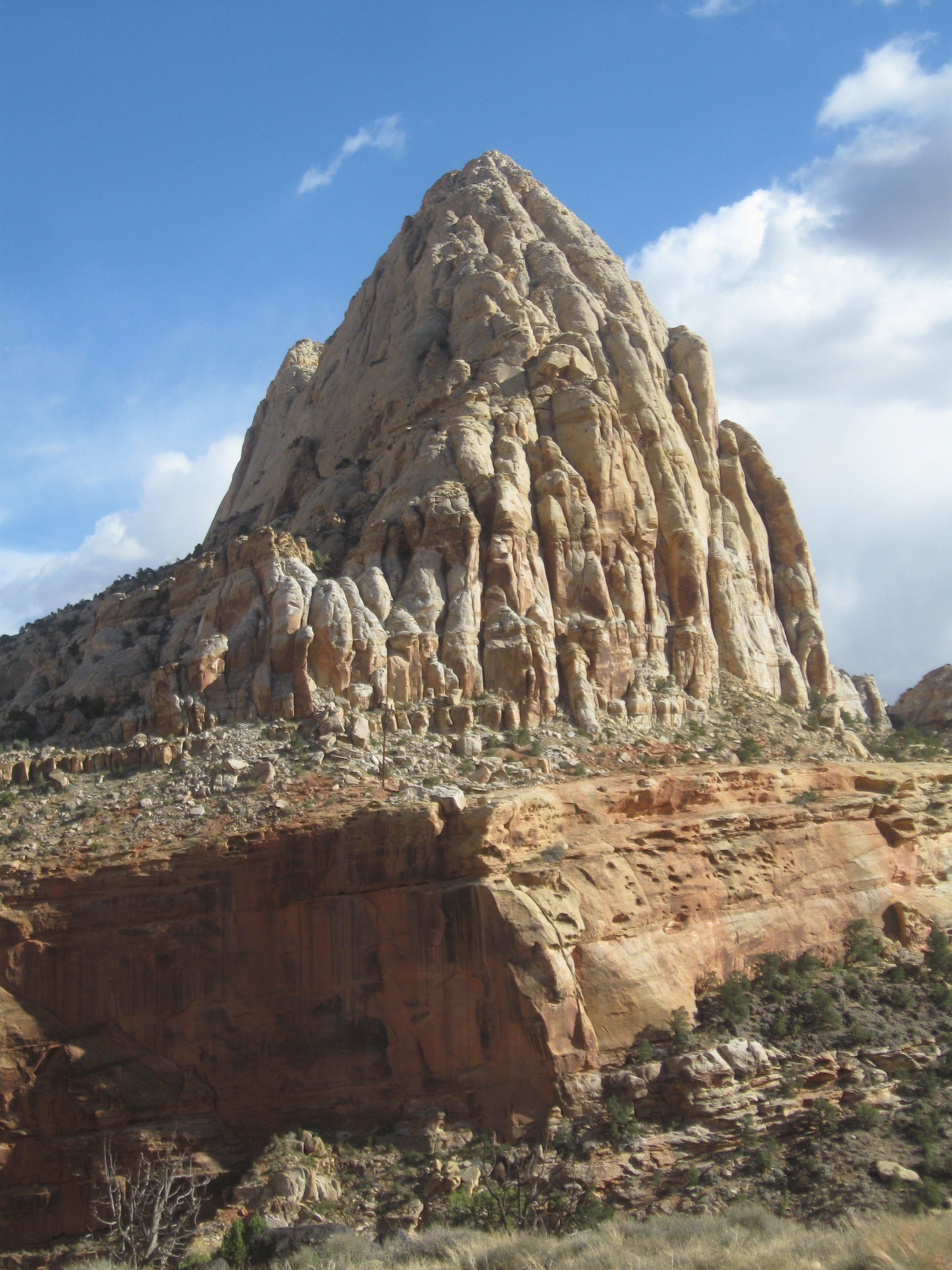

== Climate ==
Spring and fall are the most favorable seasons to visit Pectols Pyramid. According to the Köppen climate classification system, it is located in a Cold semi-arid climate zone, which is defined by the coldest month having an average mean temperature below 32 °F (0 °C), and at least 50% of the total annual precipitation being received during the spring and summer. This desert climate receives less than 10 inches (250 millimeters) of annual rainfall, and snowfall is generally light during the winter.

Climate data for Capitol Reef Visitor Center, elevation 5,653 ft (1,723 m), 1981-2010 normals, extremes 1981-2019
| Month | Jan | Feb | Mar | Apr | May | Jun | Jul | Aug | Sep | Oct | Nov | Dec | Year |
|---|---|---|---|---|---|---|---|---|---|---|---|---|---|
| Record high °F (°C) | 58.6 (14.8) | 68.3 (20.2) | 78.3 (25.7) | 84.4 (29.1) | 94.6 (34.8) | 100.2 (37.9) | 100.8 (38.2) | 97.9 (36.6) | 95.4 (35.2) | 86.1 (30.1) | 70.4 (21.3) | 61.5 (16.4) | 100.8 (38.2) |
| Mean daily maximum °F (°C) | 40.6 (4.8) | 46.4 (8.0) | 54.7 (12.6) | 65.0 (18.3) | 74.5 (23.6) | 85.3 (29.6) | 90.4 (32.4) | 87.9 (31.1) | 80.2 (26.8) | 66.1 (18.9) | 51.3 (10.7) | 40.6 (4.8) | 65.3 (18.5) |
| Mean daily minimum °F (°C) | 17.8 (−7.9) | 22.7 (−5.2) | 30.2 (−1.0) | 36.2 (2.3) | 44.7 (7.1) | 53.1 (11.7) | 60.4 (15.8) | 58.5 (14.7) | 50.4 (10.2) | 39.0 (3.9) | 27.6 (−2.4) | 18.2 (−7.7) | 38.3 (3.5) |
| Record low °F (°C) | −4.2 (−20.1) | −11.8 (−24.3) | 9.1 (−12.7) | 18.1 (−7.7) | 27.2 (−2.7) | 34.6 (1.4) | 42.4 (5.8) | 45.1 (7.3) | 29.9 (−1.2) | 11.7 (−11.3) | 8.0 (−13.3) | −7.5 (−21.9) | −11.8 (−24.3) |
| Average precipitation inches (mm) | 0.52 (13) | 0.34 (8.6) | 0.53 (13) | 0.47 (12) | 0.59 (15) | 0.47 (12) | 0.91 (23) | 1.20 (30) | 0.80 (20) | 0.98 (25) | 0.49 (12) | 0.32 (8.1) | 7.62 (194) |
| Average dew point °F (°C) | 17.3 (−8.2) | 20.8 (−6.2) | 23.0 (−5.0) | 24.5 (−4.2) | 29.1 (−1.6) | 32.0 (0.0) | 40.0 (4.4) | 41.8 (5.4) | 34.8 (1.6) | 28.2 (−2.1) | 21.9 (−5.6) | 17.5 (−8.1) | 27.6 (−2.4) |
Source: PRISM

== See also ==
- Colorado Plateau
- Geology of the Capitol Reef area
