= Hickman Natural Bridge =

Natural rock arch in Utah, US

- Rock arch
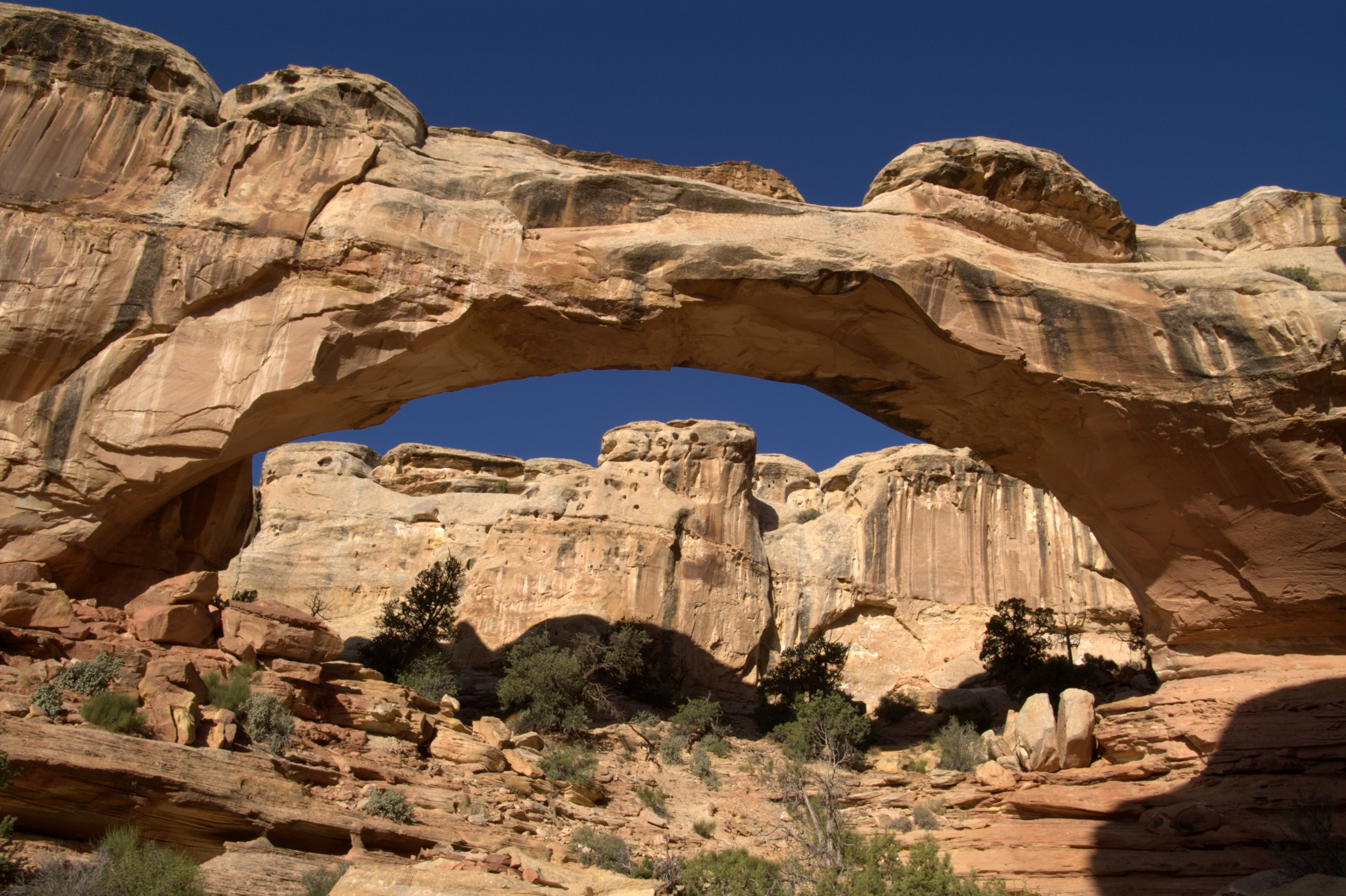
- View of the bridge

- Location in Utah
- Coordinates: 38°17′29″N 111°14′05″W
- Location: Capitol Reef National Park, Utah

Dimensions
  - Length: 133 ft (41 m)
  - Height: 125 ft (38 m)
- Elevation: 5,693 ft (1,735 m)

Hickman Natural Bridge is a 125-foot-tall (38 m) natural bridge located in Capitol Reef National Park, Wayne County, Utah, United States. The formation spans 133 feet (40 meters), making it one of the largest rock spans in the park.

== Geology ==
The sandstone bridge was carved out of a geological formation known as the Kayenta Formation 65 million years ago, formed by flowing water coursing down the rock fin and eventually breaking through the soft shale. Large basalt and andesite boulders of volcanic origin were deposited by melting glacial debris flows from the cliffs of Boulder and Thousand Lakes mountains west of the park. Hickman Bridge spans what is now a dry wash.

== History ==
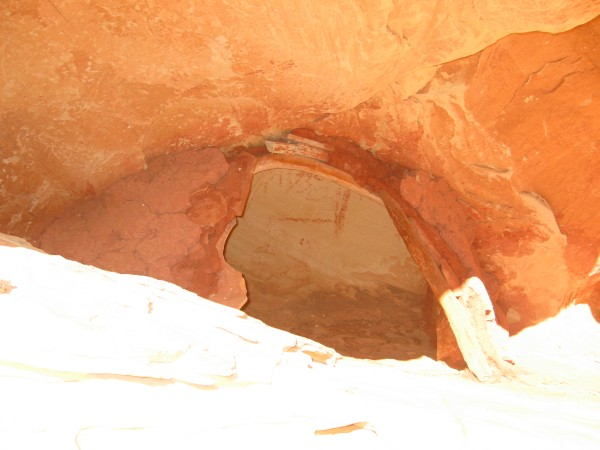
A granary constructed by the Fremont peoples

Because of its close proximity to the Fremont River, the Capitol Reef region was first settled by prehistoric Fremont people, followed by the Paiutes between 300 and 1300 C.E. Petroglyph panels as well as the remains of a granary and pithouse can be seen on the canyon walls and along the trail.

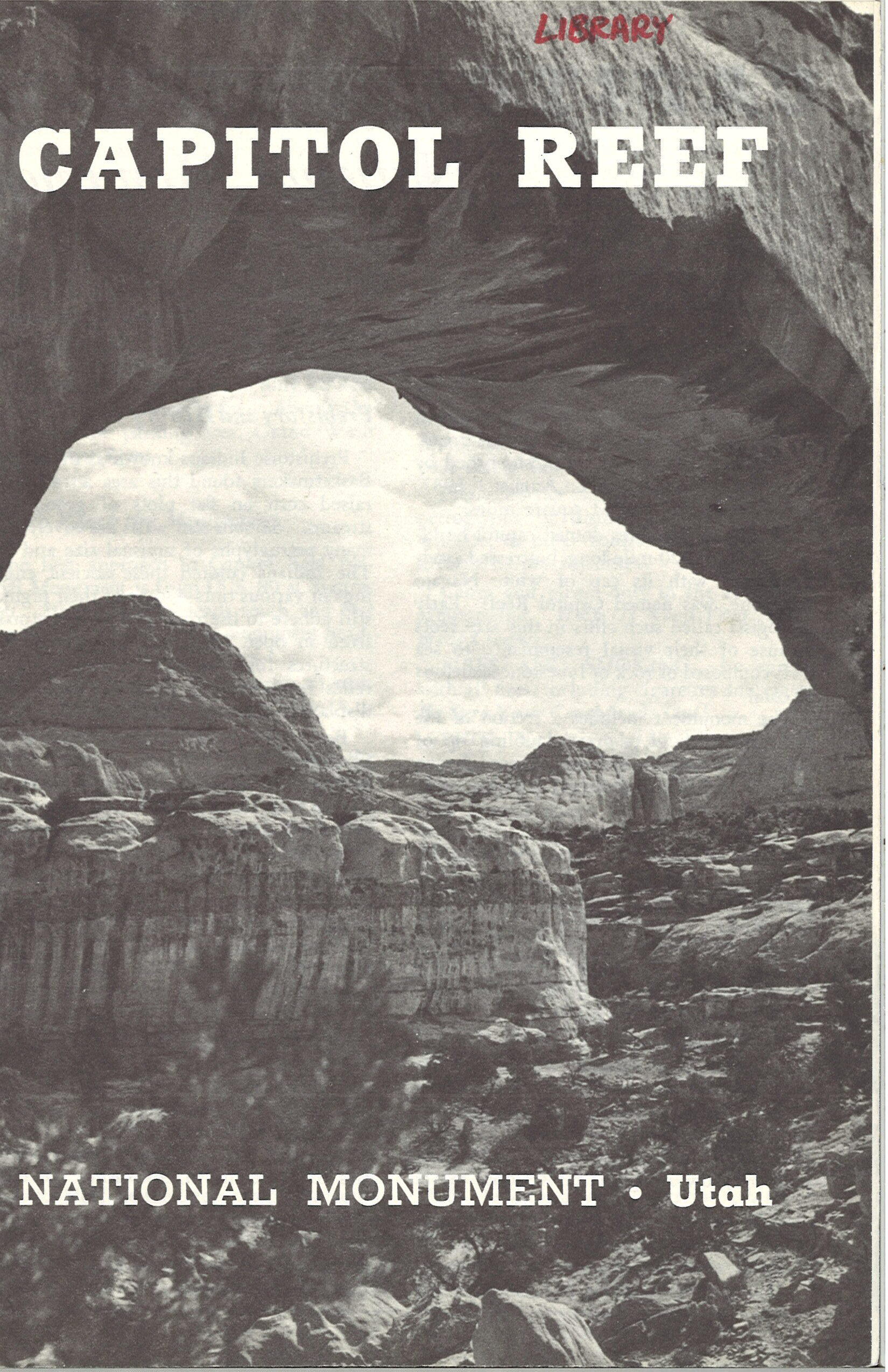
1958 travel brochure featuring Hickman Bridge on the coverpage

Mormons settled the valley near the bridge in the 1880s and established nearby Junction (later renamed Fruita). After the region was federally protected in 1937, the Civilian Conservation Corps, responsible for constructing the early infrastructure of the park, carved out the trail, and Hickman Bridge was later named after local school administrator Joseph Hickman, who was previously elected to the Utah State Legislature in 1924.

A significant rockfall occurred at the Hickman Bridge Trailhead on March 23, 2013, and the trail was closed upon discovery of the debris. With the assistance of crews from nearby Canyonlands National Park and Rocky Mountain National Park in Colorado, the trail was realigned around the debris pile and officially reopened 6 months later in November.

== Ecology ==
Native to the southwestern United States, Utah juniper trees can be seen around the canyon throughout the trail. Mormon tea, pinyon pine and prickly pear cactus are also abundant in the region. Native animals such as bighorn sheep and mountain lions inhabit the area and occasionally pose a risk to hikers.

== Climate ==
Spring and fall are the most favorable seasons to visit Hickman Bridge. According to the Köppen climate classification system, it is located in a Cold semi-arid climate zone, which is defined by the coldest month having an average mean temperature below 32 °F (0 °C), and at least 50% of the total annual precipitation being received during the spring and summer. This desert climate receives less than 10 inches (250 millimeters) of annual rainfall, and winter snowfall is generally light.

== Access ==
The bridge can be accessed via a 1.8 mile out-and-back trail from the Hickman Bridge trailhead on Utah State Route 24 near Torrey, Utah. The trail goes under and around the natural bridge, and is considered moderate difficulty by the National Park Service due to switchbacks and the trail length. The trail follows the Fremont River before entering the valley, and also gives access to the Rim Overlook Trail, Navajo Knobs Trail, Capitol Dome, and Navajo Dome.

== See also ==
- Colorado Plateau
- Geology of Utah
- Kayenta Formation
- Capitol Reef National Park
