= Fish Haven Dolomite =

Geologic formation in the southwestern United States

- Stratigraphic range: Ordovician period
- Type: Geologic formation
- Underlies: Laketown Dolomite
- Overlies: Eureka Quartzite
- Thickness: 3–570 feet (0.91–173.74 m)

Lithology
- Primary: Dolomite

Location
- Region: Idaho; Nevada; Utah
- Country: United States

Type section
- Named for: Fish Haven Creek
- Named by: Richardson (1913)

The Fish Haven Dolomite is an Ordovician period geologic formation in southern Idaho, northeastern Nevada, and northwestern Utah.

== Geology ==
It was named for Fish Haven Creek, in the Bear River Range near the Utah-Idaho state line. Other locations it is found in include the Schell Creek Range, Goshute Mountains, Deep Creek Range, Pilot Range, and Toana John Mountains.

The Dolomite formation overlies the Eureka Quartzite formation, and underlies the Laketown Dolomite formation.

The Fish Haven Dolomite, like the Ely Springs Dolomite, was formed by subtidal to intertidal shallow shelf carbonates, deposited in water depths of 100 feet (30 m) or less in lagoonal and shallow shoal settings.

== Fossils ==
The formation preserves fossils dating back to the Ordovician period of the Paleozoic Era.

== See also ==
- Ordovician United States
- List of fossiliferous stratigraphic units in Idaho
- List of fossiliferous stratigraphic units in Nevada
- List of fossiliferous stratigraphic units in Utah
