= Navajo Dome =

Summit in Utah, United States

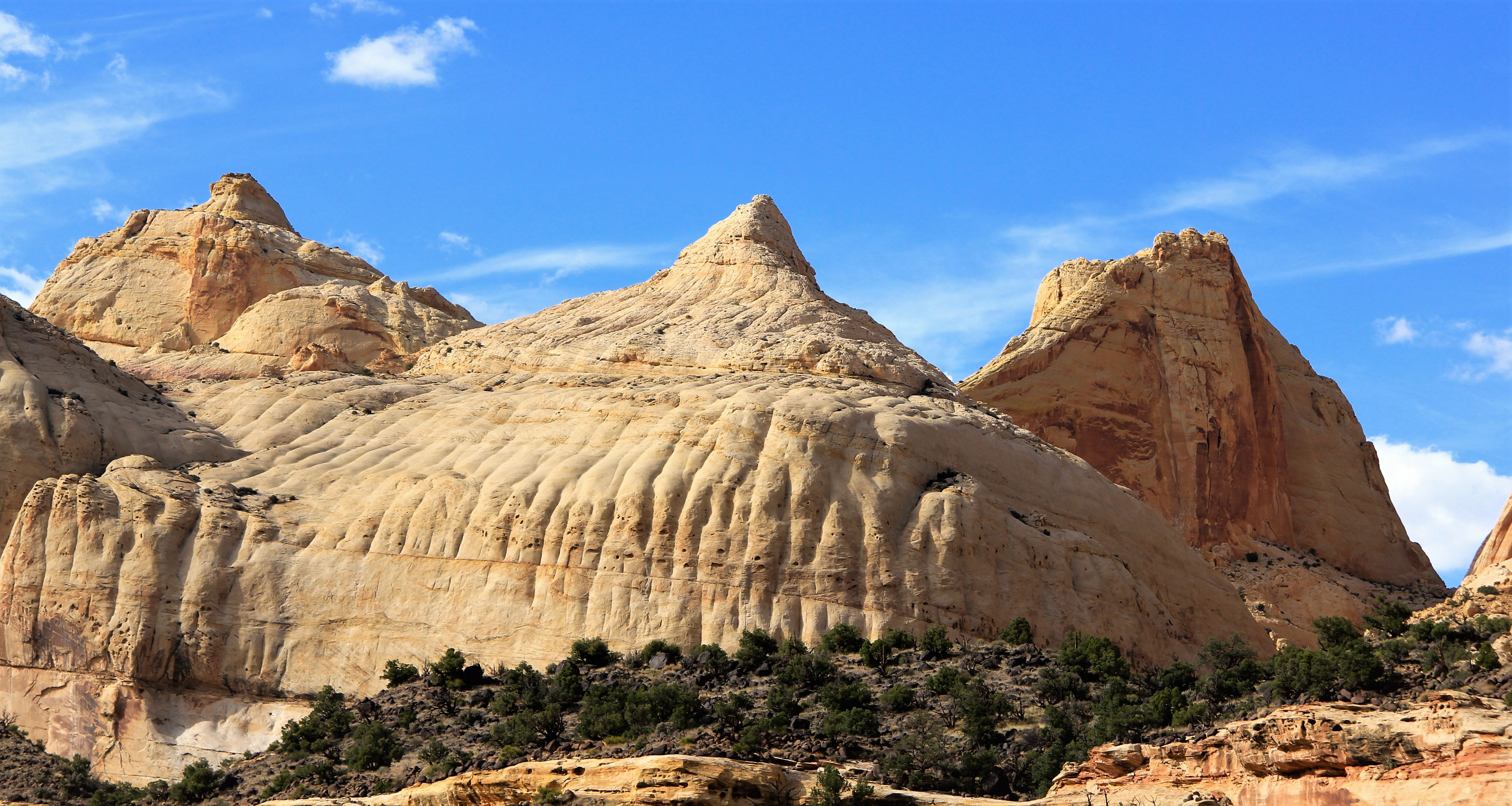
- Navajo Dome centered, southeast aspect

Highest point
- Elevation: 6,489 ft (1,978 m)
- Prominence: 489 ft (149 m)
- Isolation: 0.38 mi (0.61 km)
- Coordinates: 38°17′54″N 111°13′40″W

Geography
- Location within Utah Location within the United States
- Country: United States
- State: Utah
- County: Wayne
- Protected area: Capitol Reef National Park
- Parent range: Colorado Plateau
- Topo map: USGS Fruita

Geology
- Rock age: Jurassic
- Rock type: Navajo Sandstone

Climbing
- Easiest route: climbing

Navajo Dome is a 6,489-foot (1,978-meter) elevation summit located in Capitol Reef National Park, in Wayne County of Utah, United States. This iconic landmark is situated two miles (3.2 km) east of the park's visitor center, and 0.85 mi (1.37 km) northwest of Capitol Dome. Precipitation runoff from this feature is drained by the Fremont River, which in turn is within the Colorado River drainage basin. It rises 1,100 feet (340 meters) above the Fremont River and Highway 24, from which it is visible. The approach to the base of this peak is made via the Hickman Bridge Trail. This geological feature's descriptive name derives from its Navajo Sandstone composition and dome-like shape.

== Geology ==
Navajo Dome is composed of the Navajo Sandstone, which is believed to have formed about 180 million years ago as a giant sand sea, the largest in Earth's history. In a hot, dry climate, wind blew over sand dunes, creating large, sweeping crossbeds which date to the Jurassic. Long after the sedimentary rocks were deposited, the Colorado Plateau was uplifted relatively evenly, keeping the layers roughly horizontal, but Capitol Reef is an exception because of the Waterpocket Fold, a classic monocline, which formed between 50 and 70 million years ago during the Laramide Orogeny.

== Gallery ==
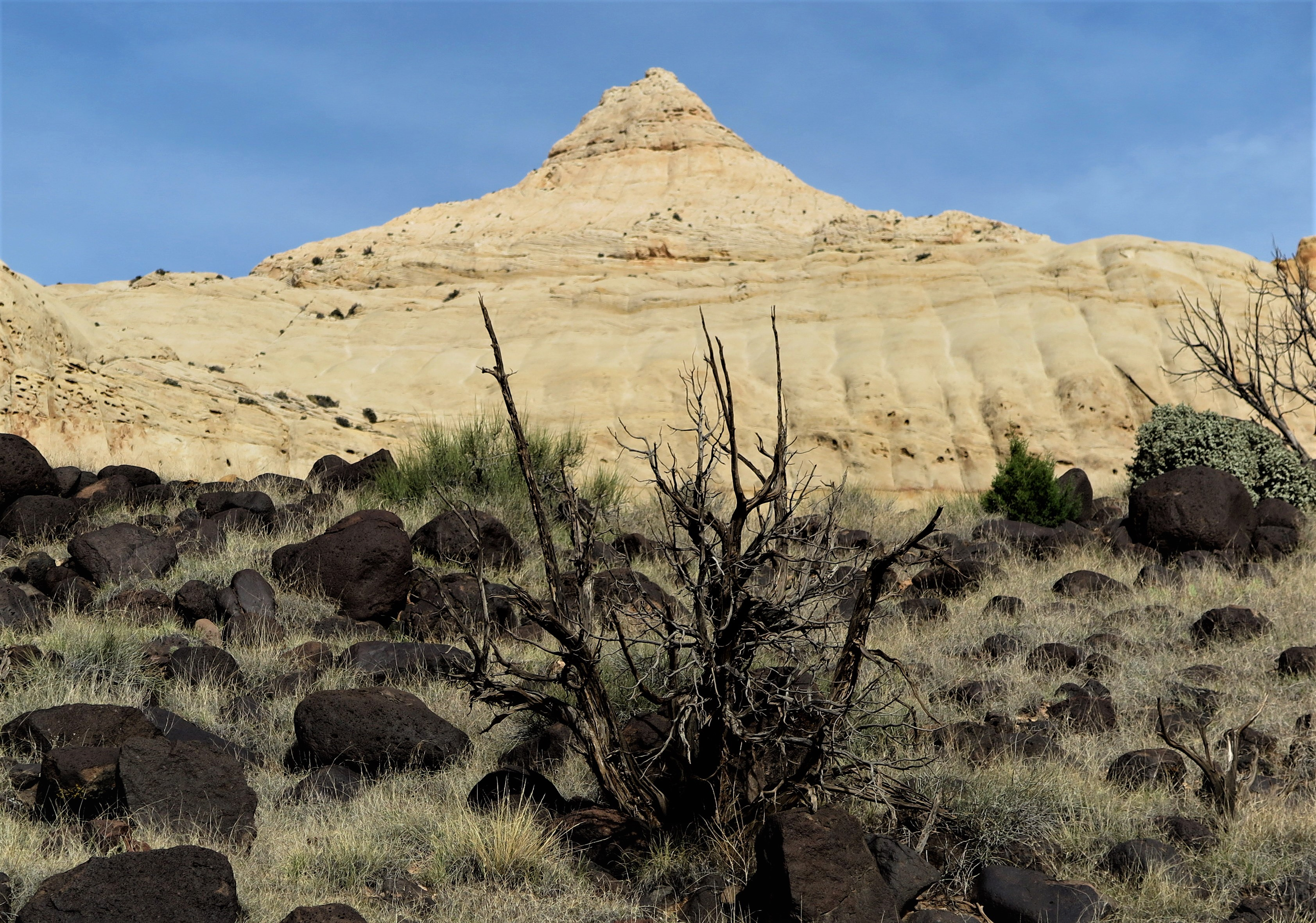

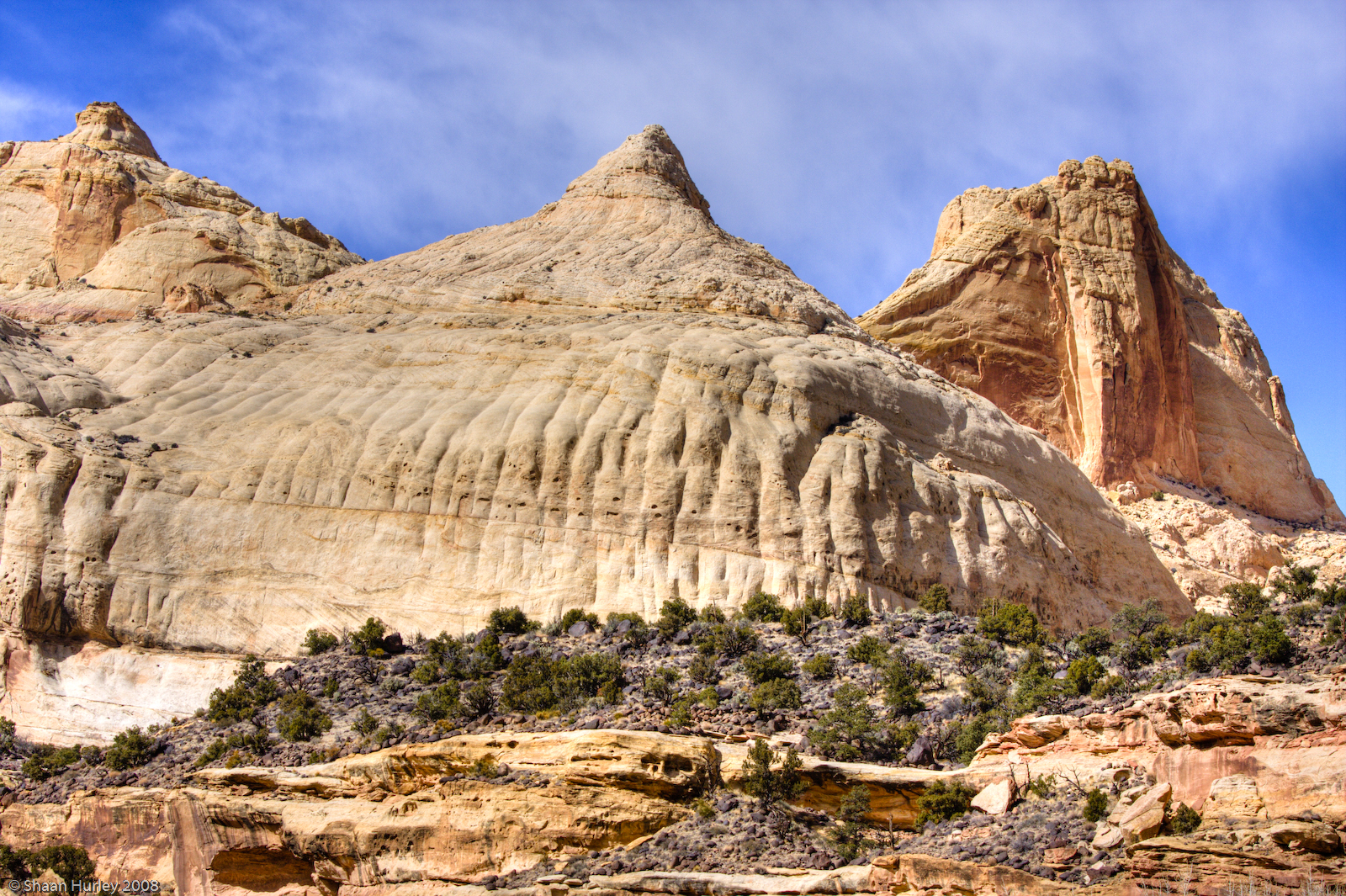

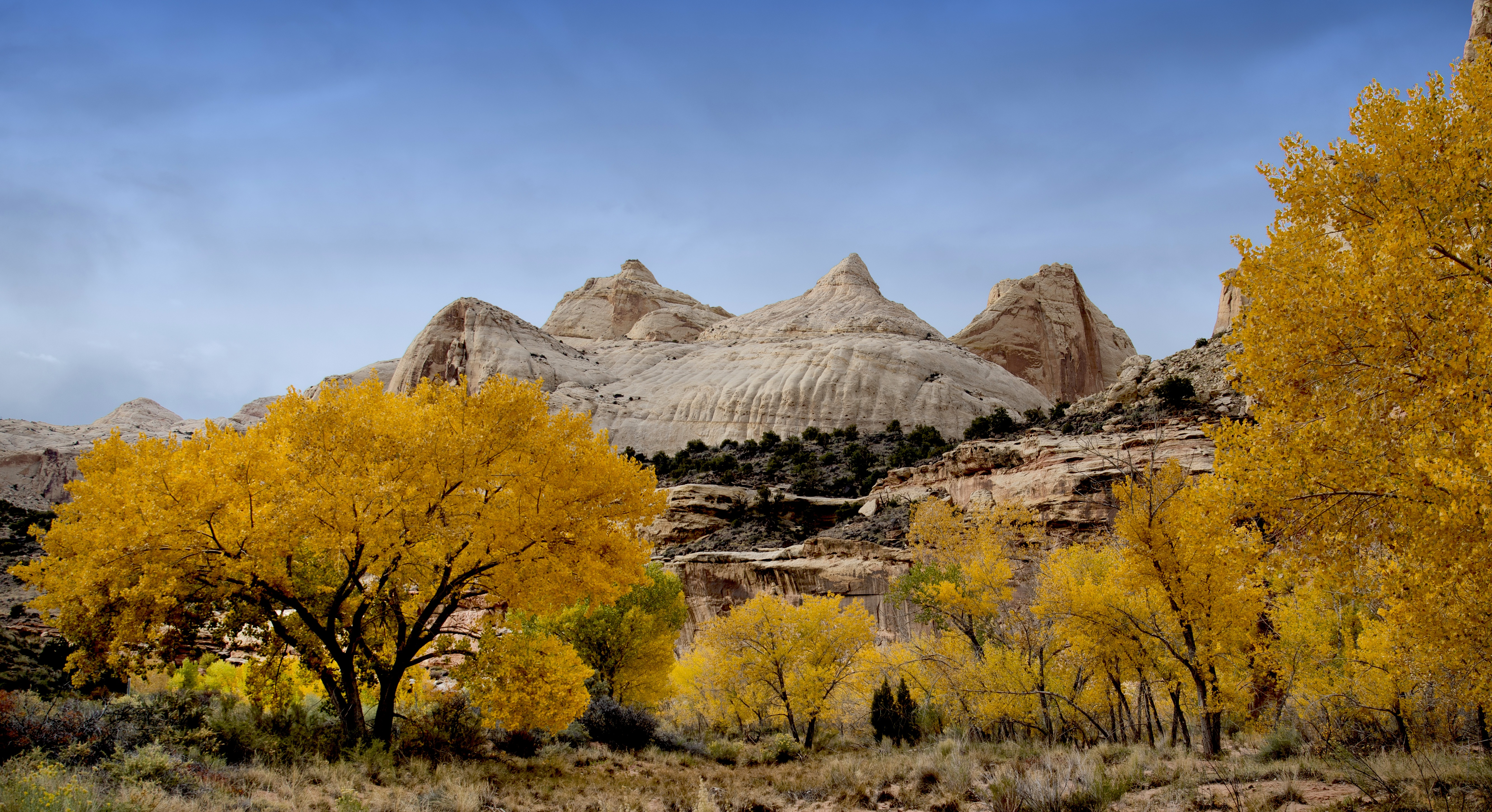

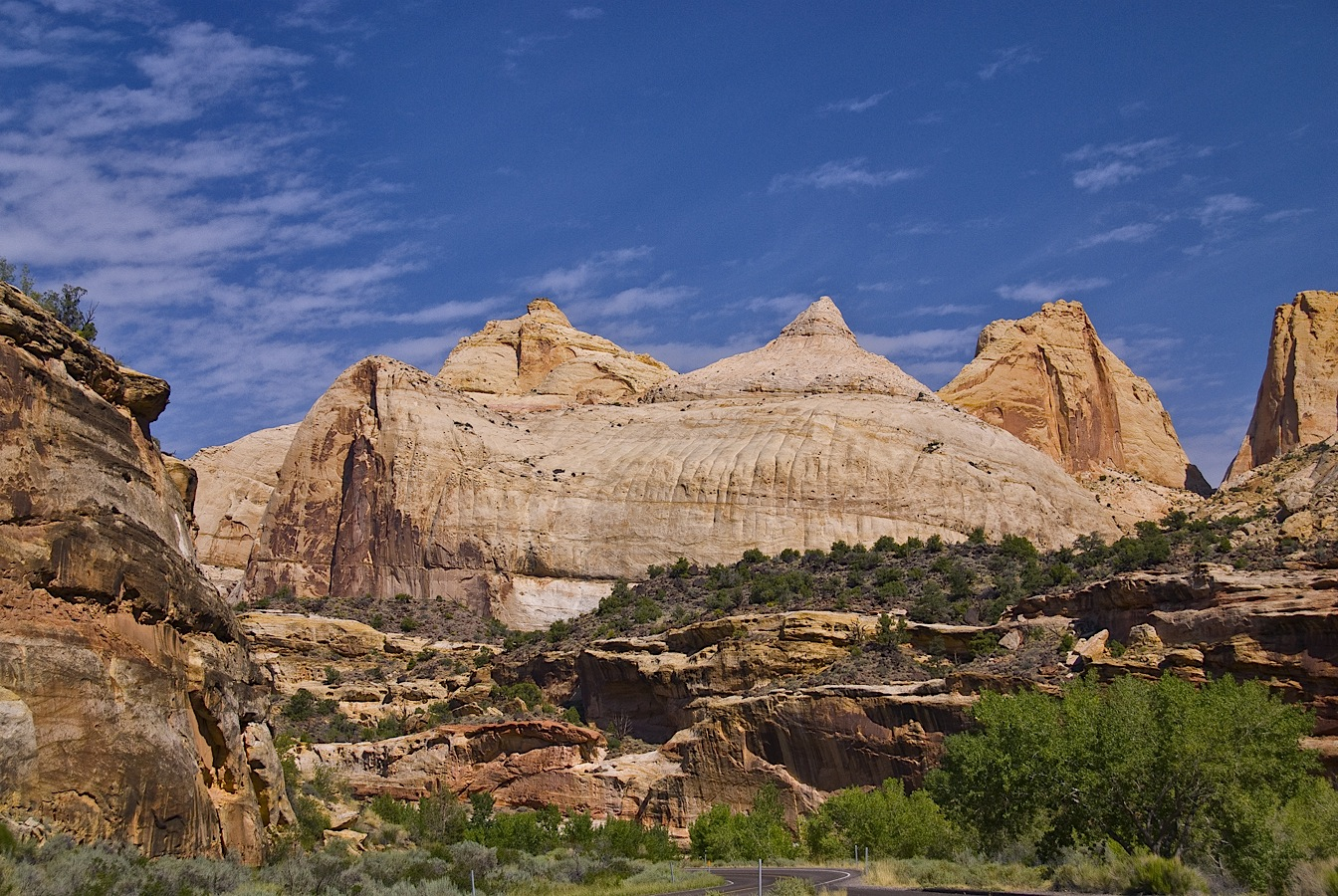

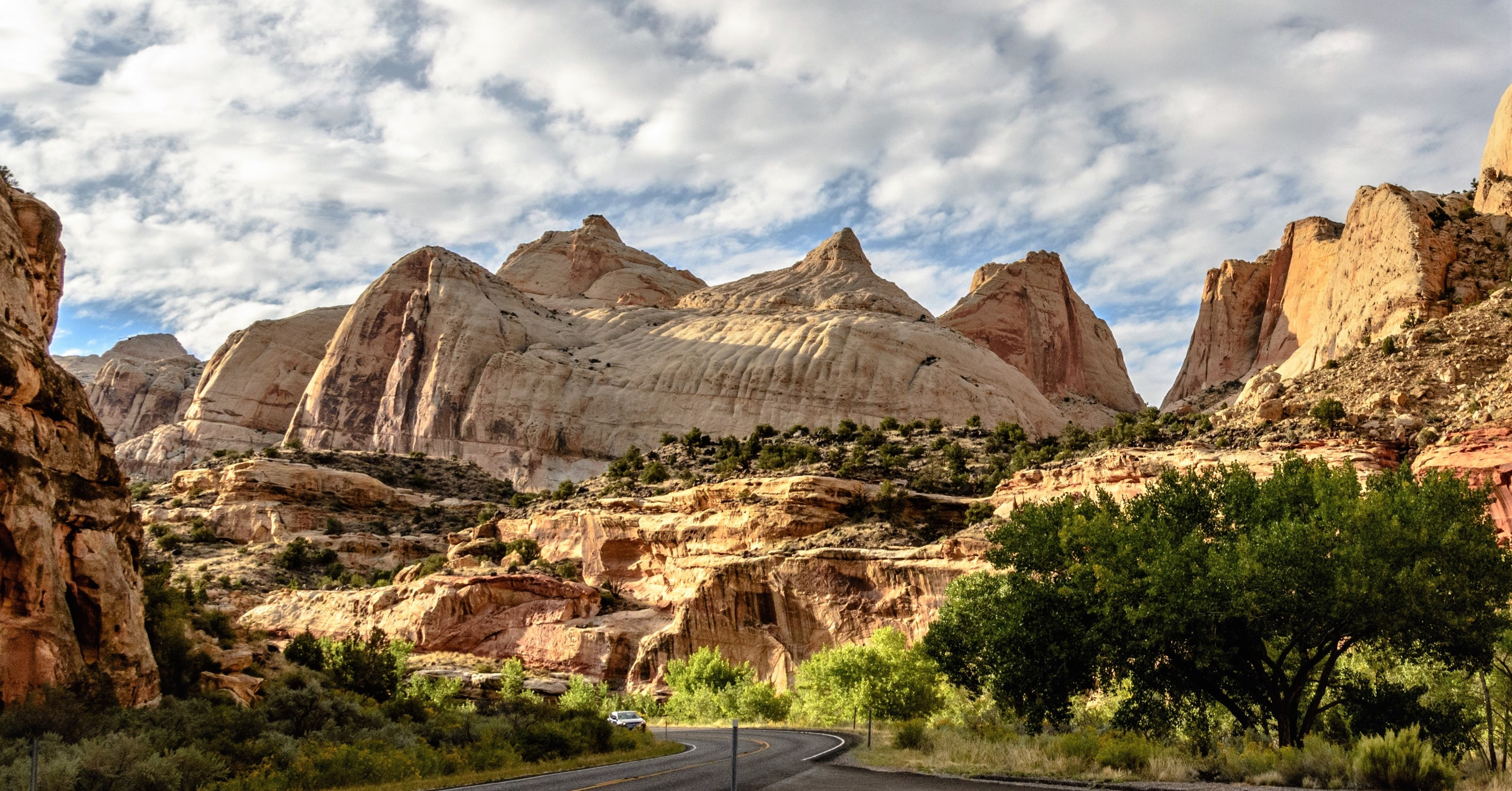

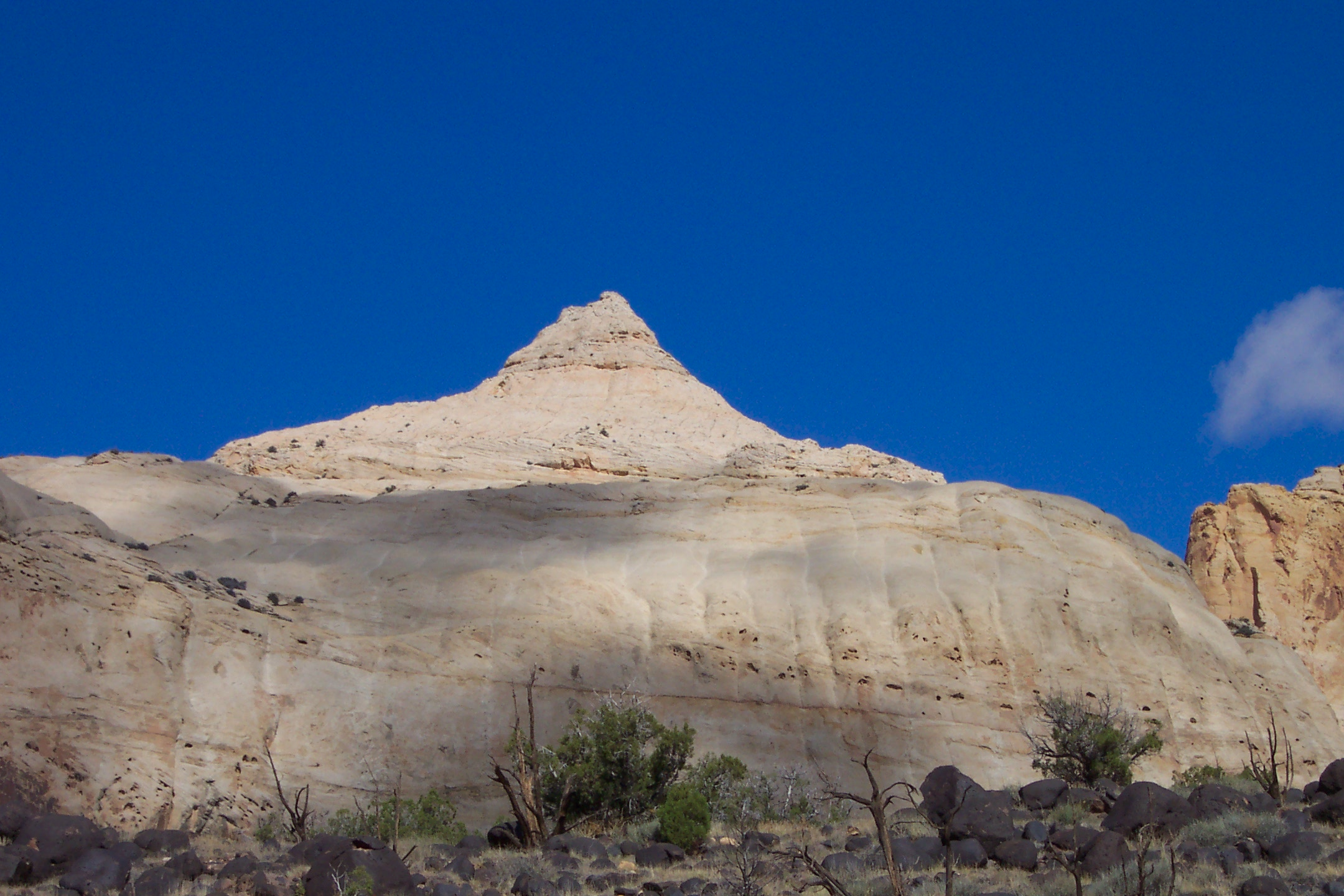

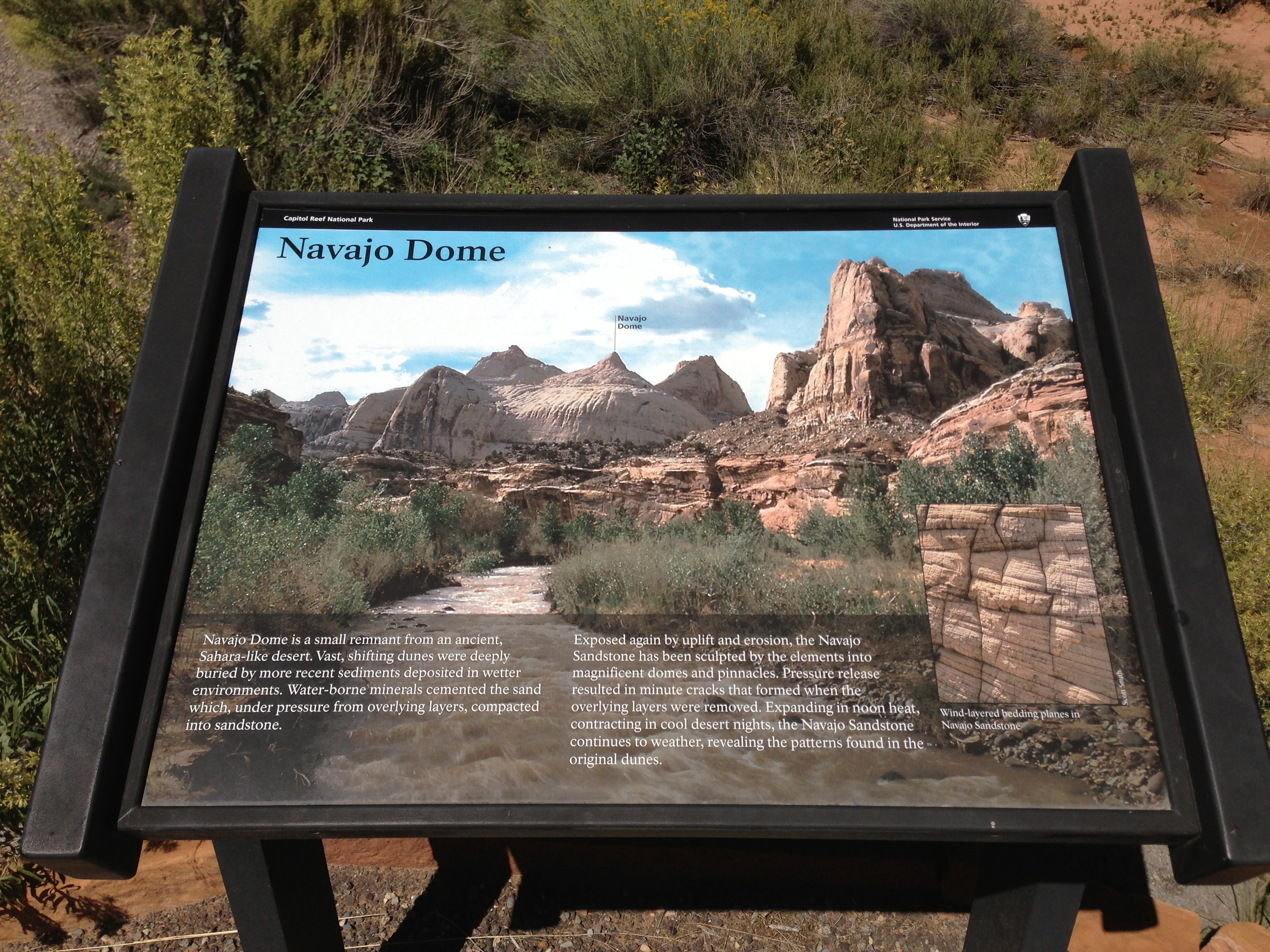

== Climate ==
Spring and fall are the most favorable seasons to visit Navajo Dome. According to the Köppen climate classification system, it is located in a Cold semi-arid climate zone, which is defined by the coldest month having an average mean temperature below 32 °F (0 °C), and at least 50% of the total annual precipitation being received during the spring and summer. This desert climate receives less than 10 inches (250 millimeters) of annual rainfall, and snowfall is generally light during the winter.

Climate data for Capitol Reef Visitor Center, elevation 5,653 ft (1,723 m), 1981-2010 normals, extremes 1981-2019
| Month | Jan | Feb | Mar | Apr | May | Jun | Jul | Aug | Sep | Oct | Nov | Dec | Year |
|---|---|---|---|---|---|---|---|---|---|---|---|---|---|
| Record high °F (°C) | 58.6 (14.8) | 68.3 (20.2) | 78.3 (25.7) | 84.4 (29.1) | 94.6 (34.8) | 100.2 (37.9) | 100.8 (38.2) | 97.9 (36.6) | 95.4 (35.2) | 86.1 (30.1) | 70.4 (21.3) | 61.5 (16.4) | 100.8 (38.2) |
| Mean daily maximum °F (°C) | 40.6 (4.8) | 46.4 (8.0) | 54.7 (12.6) | 65.0 (18.3) | 74.5 (23.6) | 85.3 (29.6) | 90.4 (32.4) | 87.9 (31.1) | 80.2 (26.8) | 66.1 (18.9) | 51.3 (10.7) | 40.6 (4.8) | 65.3 (18.5) |
| Mean daily minimum °F (°C) | 17.8 (−7.9) | 22.7 (−5.2) | 30.2 (−1.0) | 36.2 (2.3) | 44.7 (7.1) | 53.1 (11.7) | 60.4 (15.8) | 58.5 (14.7) | 50.4 (10.2) | 39.0 (3.9) | 27.6 (−2.4) | 18.2 (−7.7) | 38.3 (3.5) |
| Record low °F (°C) | −4.2 (−20.1) | −11.8 (−24.3) | 9.1 (−12.7) | 18.1 (−7.7) | 27.2 (−2.7) | 34.6 (1.4) | 42.4 (5.8) | 45.1 (7.3) | 29.9 (−1.2) | 11.7 (−11.3) | 8.0 (−13.3) | −7.5 (−21.9) | −11.8 (−24.3) |
| Average precipitation inches (mm) | 0.52 (13) | 0.34 (8.6) | 0.53 (13) | 0.47 (12) | 0.59 (15) | 0.47 (12) | 0.91 (23) | 1.20 (30) | 0.80 (20) | 0.98 (25) | 0.49 (12) | 0.32 (8.1) | 7.62 (194) |
| Average dew point °F (°C) | 17.3 (−8.2) | 20.8 (−6.2) | 23.0 (−5.0) | 24.5 (−4.2) | 29.1 (−1.6) | 32.0 (0.0) | 40.0 (4.4) | 41.8 (5.4) | 34.8 (1.6) | 28.2 (−2.1) | 21.9 (−5.6) | 17.5 (−8.1) | 27.6 (−2.4) |
Source: PRISM

== See also ==
- Colorado Plateau
- Geology of the Capitol Reef area
