= Needle Range =

Mountain range in Nye County, Nevada, US

- Location within Nevada

Highest point
- Elevation: 2,417 m (7,930 ft)

Geography
- Country: United States
- State: Nevada
- District: Nye County
- Range coordinates: 38°44′28.759″N 116°6′47.187″W
- Topo map: USGS Chaos Creek

The Needle Range is a mountain range in Nye County, Nevada, United States.
