= Toana John Mountains =

Mountain range in Elko County, Nevada, US

- Location within Nevada

Highest point
- Elevation: 2,161 m (7,090 ft)

Geography
- Country: United States
- State: Nevada
- District: Elko County
- Range coordinates: 41°48′55.694″N 114°28′56.103″W
- Topo map: USGS Devils Pass

The Toana John Mountains are a mountain range in Elko County, Nevada. The range may be named for an Indian chief "Toana John".
