= Laketown Dolomite =

Geologic formation in Nevada and Utah, USA

- Stratigraphic range: Silurian
- Type: Geologic formation
- Sub-units: Gettel Lake, High Lake, Jack Valley, Portage Canyon & Tony Grove Lake Members

Lithology
- Primary: Dolomite

Location
- Coordinates: 39.3°N 114.9°W
- Approximate paleocoordinates: 7.7°S 71.7°W
- Region: Nevada, Utah
- Country: United States
- Laketown Dolomite (the United States) Laketown Dolomite (Nevada)

The Laketown Dolomite is a dolomite geologic formation in Nevada and Utah. It preserves fossils dating back to the Silurian period.

== See also ==
- List of fossiliferous stratigraphic units in Nevada
- List of fossiliferous stratigraphic units in Utah
- Paleontology in Nevada
- Paleontology in Utah
