= Capitol Dome (Utah) =

Mountain in the state of Utah, U.S.

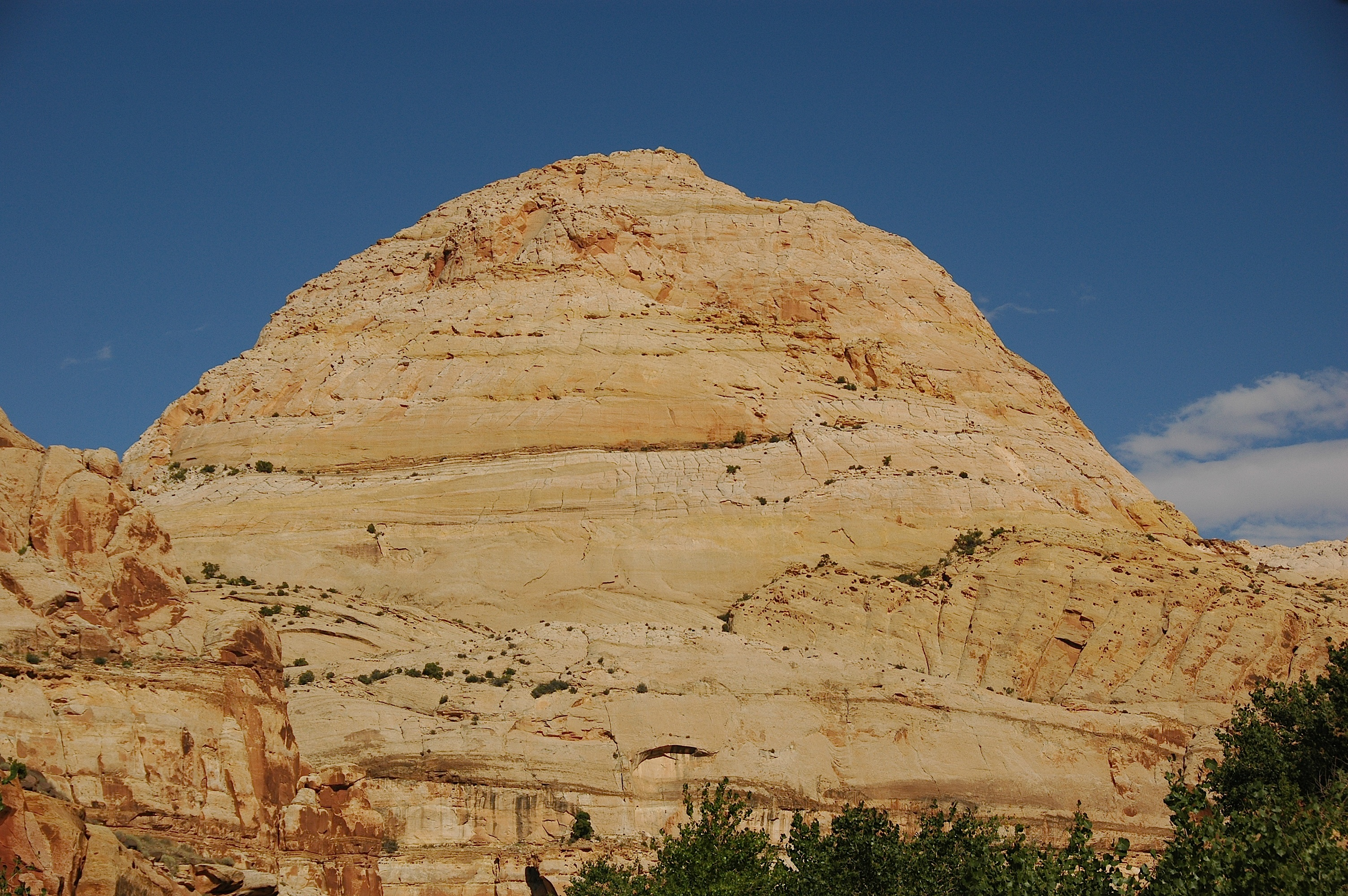
- West aspect, from State Route 24

Highest point
- Elevation: 6,120 ft (1,870 m)
- Prominence: 320 ft (98 m)
- Parent peak: Navajo Dome (6,485 ft)
- Isolation: 0.54 mi (0.87 km)
- Coordinates: 38°17′21″N 111°13′05″W

Geography
- Location within Utah Location within the United States
- Country: United States
- State: Utah
- County: Wayne
- Protected area: Capitol Reef National Park
- Parent range: Colorado Plateau
- Topo map: USGS Fruita

Geology
- Rock age: Jurassic
- Rock type: Navajo Sandstone

Climbing
- Easiest route: class 5.x climbing

Capitol Dome is a 6,120-foot-elevation (1,870 m) summit located in Capitol Reef National Park, in Wayne County, Utah, United States. This iconic landmark is situated 2.5 miles (4.0 km) east of the park's visitor center, and 0.85 mi (1.37 km) southeast of Navajo Dome. Precipitation runoff from this feature is drained by tributaries of the Fremont River, which in turn is within the Colorado River drainage basin. It towers 800 feet (240 m) above the Fremont River and State Route 24. This geological feature's dome-like shape reminded early explorers and settlers of the dome of the United States Capitol in Washington D.C., and lent the park its name.

== Geology ==
Capitol Dome is composed of Navajo Sandstone, which is believed to have formed about 180 million years ago as a giant sand sea, the largest in Earth's history. In a hot, dry climate, wind blew over sand dunes, creating large, sweeping crossbeds which date to the Jurassic. Long after the sedimentary rocks were deposited, the Colorado Plateau was uplifted relatively evenly, keeping the layers roughly horizontal, but Capitol Reef is an exception because of the Waterpocket Fold, a classic monocline, which formed between 50 and 70 million years ago during the Laramide Orogeny.

== Gallery ==
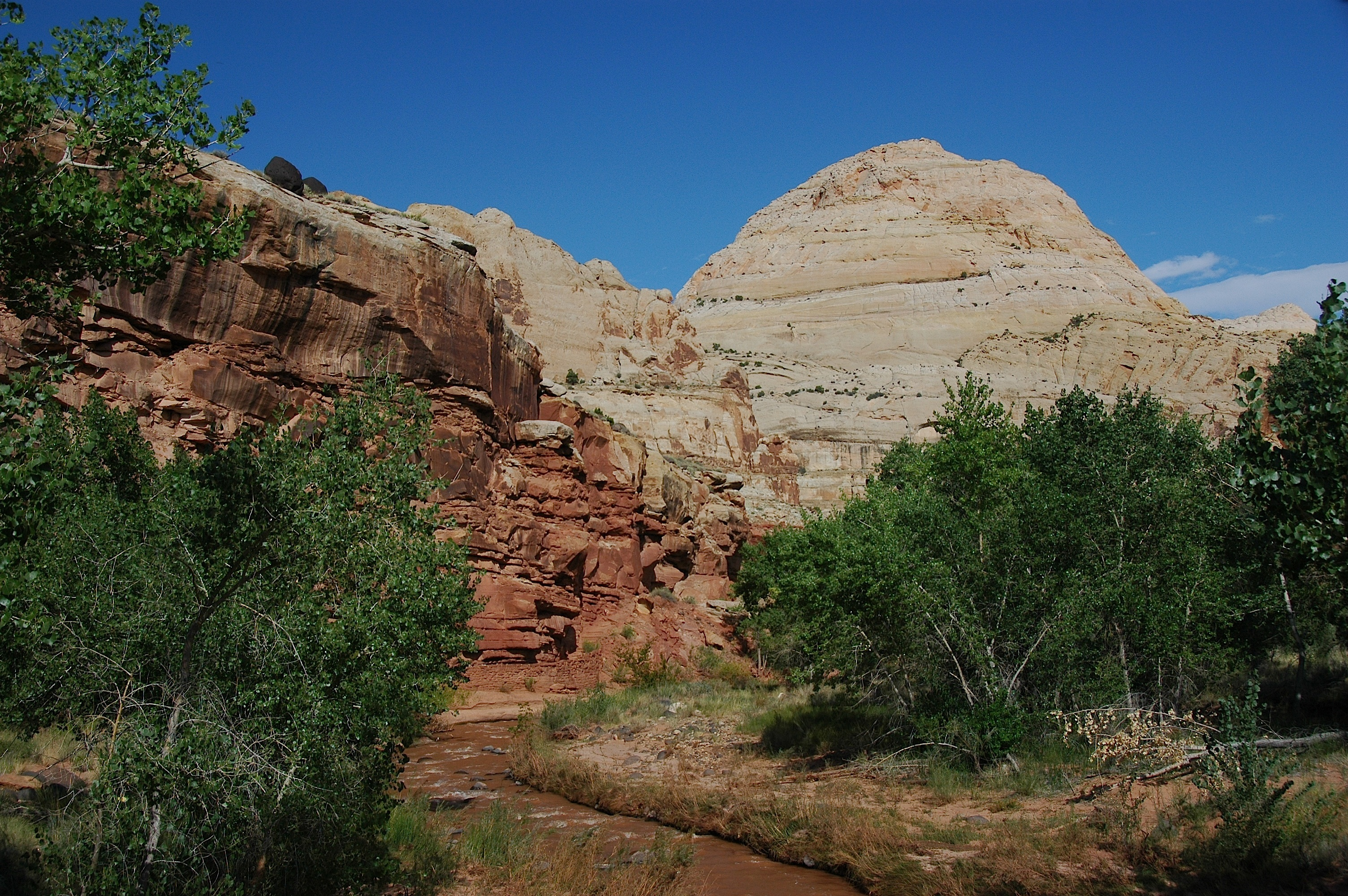
Capitol Dome, west aspect, with Fremont River

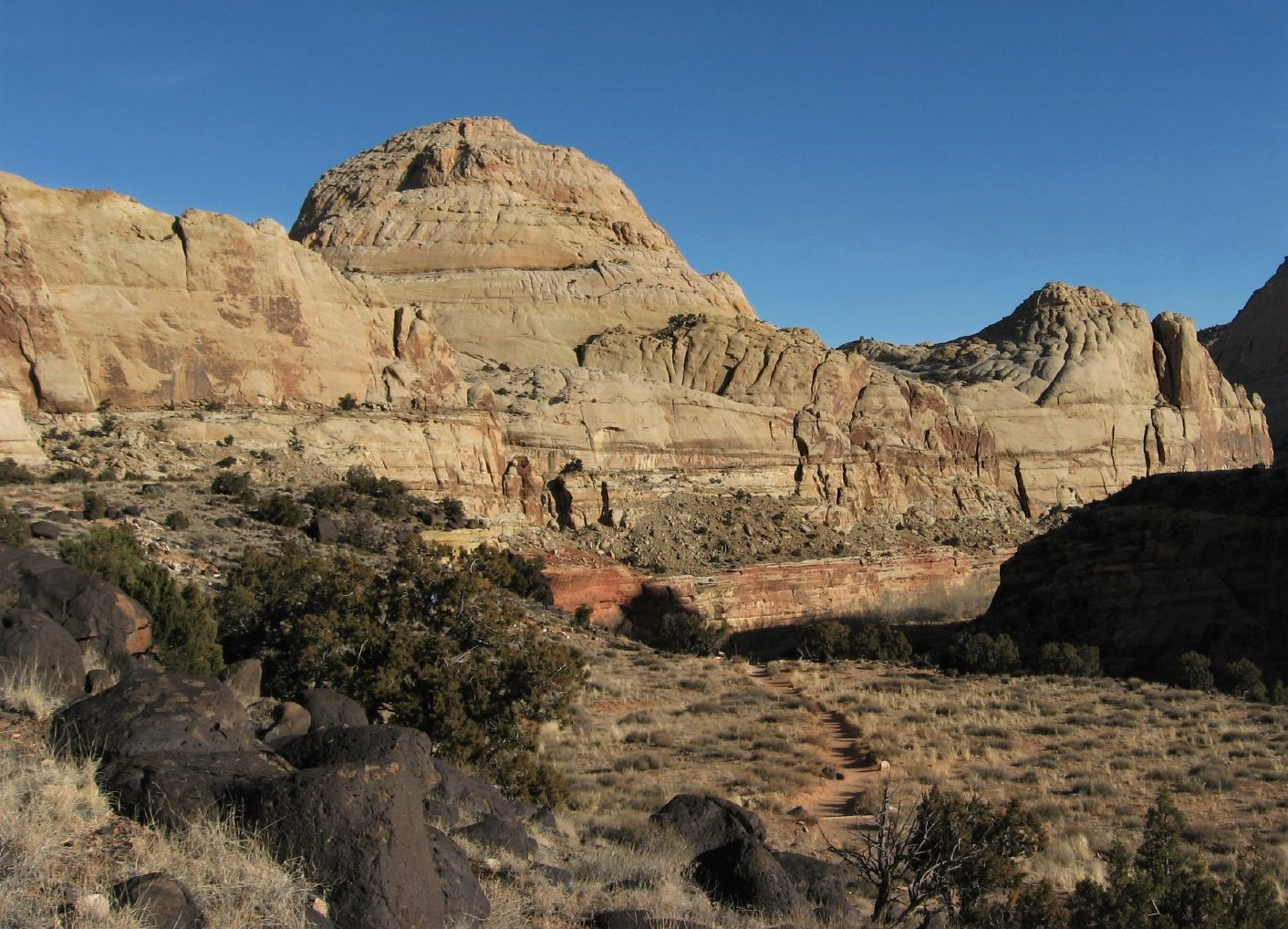
Capitol Dome from Hickman Bridge Trail

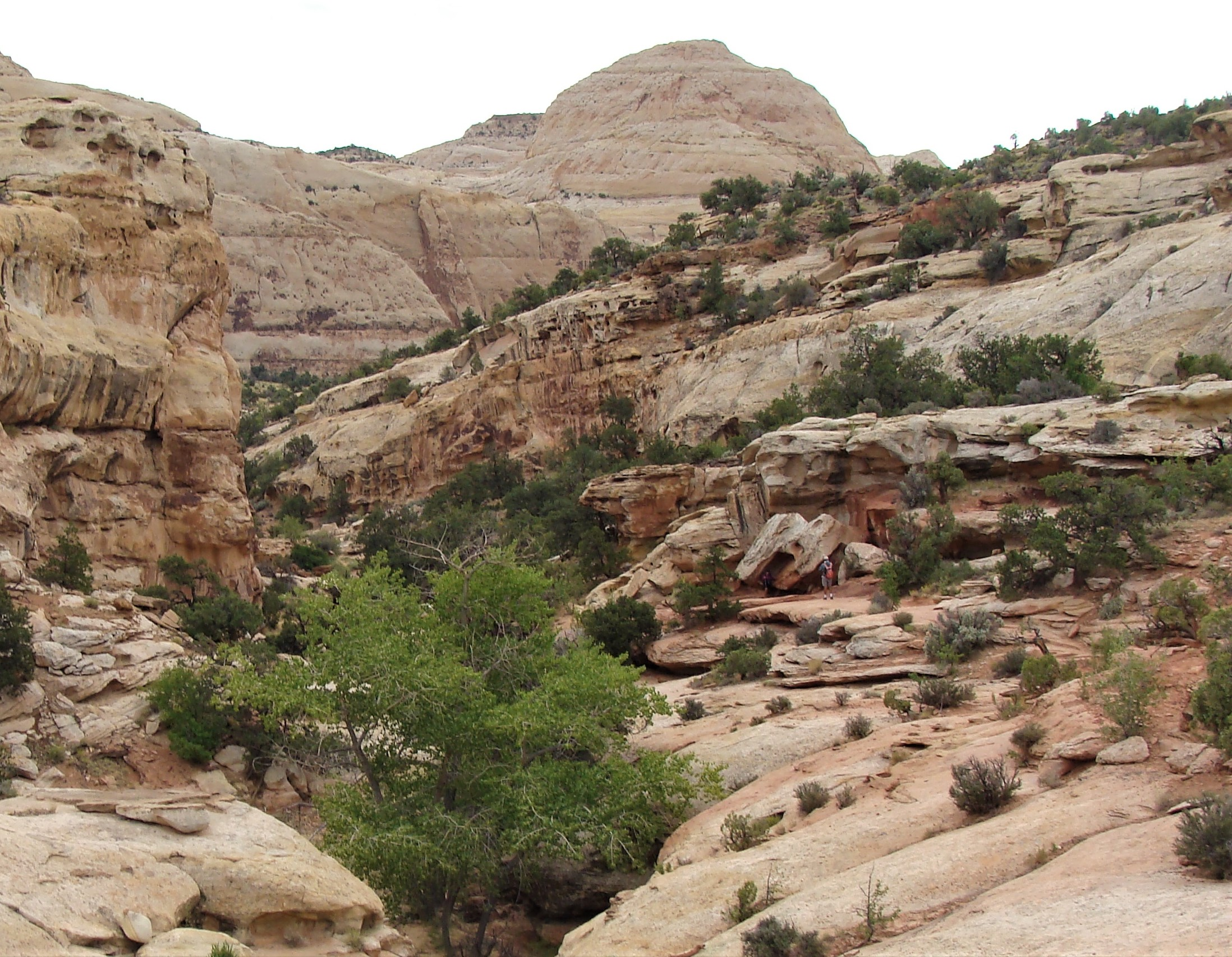
Capitol Dome from Hickman Bridge Trail

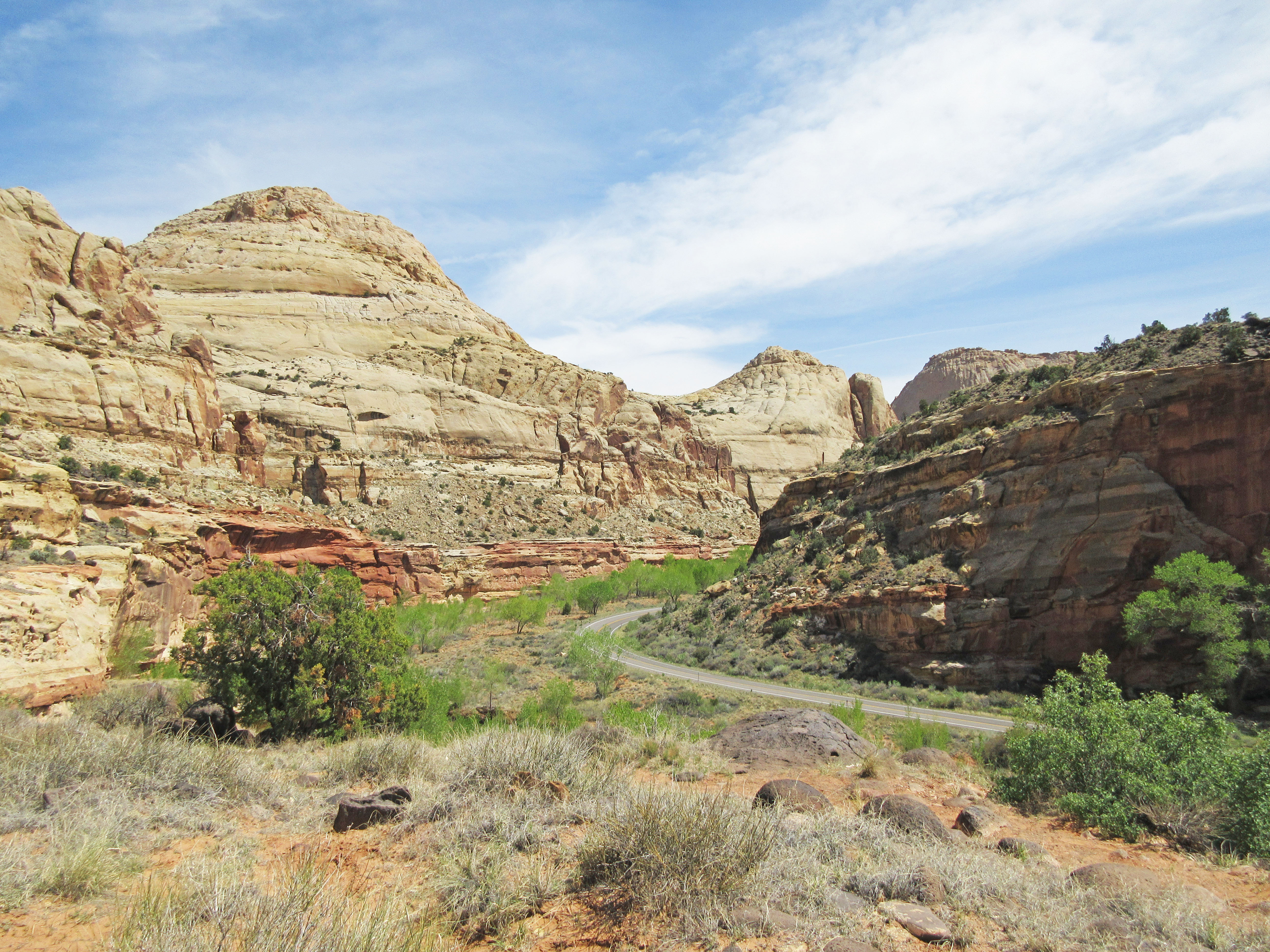
Capitol Dome (left) and Highway 24

== Climate ==
Spring and fall are the most favorable seasons to visit Capitol Dome. According to the Köppen climate classification system, it is located in a Cold semi-arid climate zone, which is defined by the coldest month having an average mean temperature below 32 °F (0 °C), and at least 50% of the total annual precipitation being received during the spring and summer. This desert climate receives less than 10 inches (250 millimeters) of annual rainfall, and snowfall is generally light during the winter.

Climate data for Capitol Reef Visitor Center, elevation 5,653 ft (1,723 m), 1981-2010 normals, extremes 1981-2019
Month	Jan	Feb	Mar	Apr	May	Jun	Jul	Aug	Sep	Oct	Nov	Dec	Year
Record high °F (°C)	58.6 (14.8)	68.3 (20.2)	78.3 (25.7)	84.4 (29.1)	94.6 (34.8)	100.2 (37.9)	100.8 (38.2)	97.9 (36.6)	95.4 (35.2)	86.1 (30.1)	70.4 (21.3)	61.5 (16.4)	100.8 (38.2)
Mean daily maximum °F (°C)	40.6 (4.8)	46.4 (8.0)	54.7 (12.6)	65.0 (18.3)	74.5 (23.6)	85.3 (29.6)	90.4 (32.4)	87.9 (31.1)	80.2 (26.8)	66.1 (18.9)	51.3 (10.7)	40.6 (4.8)	65.3 (18.5)
Mean daily minimum °F (°C)	17.8 (−7.9)	22.7 (−5.2)	30.2 (−1.0)	36.2 (2.3)	44.7 (7.1)	53.1 (11.7)	60.4 (15.8)	58.5 (14.7)	50.4 (10.2)	39.0 (3.9)	27.6 (−2.4)	18.2 (−7.7)	38.3 (3.5)
Record low °F (°C)	−4.2 (−20.1)	−11.8 (−24.3)	9.1 (−12.7)	18.1 (−7.7)	27.2 (−2.7)	34.6 (1.4)	42.4 (5.8)	45.1 (7.3)	29.9 (−1.2)	11.7 (−11.3)	8.0 (−13.3)	−7.5 (−21.9)	−11.8 (−24.3)
Average precipitation inches (mm)	0.52 (13)	0.34 (8.6)	0.53 (13)	0.47 (12)	0.59 (15)	0.47 (12)	0.91 (23)	1.20 (30)	0.80 (20)	0.98 (25)	0.49 (12)	0.32 (8.1)	7.62 (194)
Average dew point °F (°C)	17.3 (−8.2)	20.8 (−6.2)	23.0 (−5.0)	24.5 (−4.2)	29.1 (−1.6)	32.0 (0.0)	40.0 (4.4)	41.8 (5.4)	34.8 (1.6)	28.2 (−2.1)	21.9 (−5.6)	17.5 (−8.1)	27.6 (−2.4)
Source: PRISM

== See also ==
- List of mountains in Utah
- Geology of the Capitol Reef area
