= List of fossiliferous stratigraphic units in Colorado =

Coordinates: 38.9972°N 105.5478°W

The location of the state of Colorado in the United States

This is a list of fossil-bearing stratigraphic units in the U.S. state of Colorado.

== Sites ==
Group or formation	Period	Notes
Alamosa Formation	Pleistocene	
Animas Formation	Paleogene, Cretaceous	
Arapahoe Formation	Cretaceous	
Battle Mountain Formation	Carboniferous	
Belden Shale	Carboniferous	
Browns Park Formation	Neogene	
Brule Formation	Paleogene	
Carline Shale	Cretaceous	
Chadron Formation	Paleogene	
Chinle Formation	Triassic	
Chinle Group/Sheep Pen Sandstone	Triassic	
Chinle Group/Sloan Canyon Formation	Triassic	
Coalmont Formation	Paleogene	
Colorado Group/Carlile Shale	Cretaceous	
Colorado Group/Graneros Shale	Cretaceous	
Colorado Group/Greenhorn Limestone	Cretaceous	
Colorado Group/Niobrara Formation	Cretaceous	
Creede Formation	Paleogene	
Cuchara Formation	Paleogene	
Cutler Formation	Permian	
D Sandstone	Cretaceous	
D1 Formation	Paleogene	
Dakota Formation	Cretaceous	
Dakota Group/Mesa Rica Sandstone	Cretaceous	
Dakota Group/Muddy Sandstone	Cretaceous	
Dakota Group/Pajarito Formation	Cretaceous	
Dakota Group/Plainview Formation	Cretaceous	
Dakota Group/South Platte Formation	Cretaceous	
Dawson Formation	Paleogene	
DeBeque Formation	Paleogene	
Denver Formation	Paleogene, Cretaceous	
Dotsero Formation	Cambrian	
Dyer Formation	Devonian	
Farisita Formation	Paleogene	
Florissant Formation	Paleogene	
Fort Union Formation	Paleogene	
Fountain Formation	Carboniferous	
Fox Hills Formation	Cretaceous	
Fox Hills Sandstone	Cretaceous	
Fremont Formation	Ordovician	
Glen Canyon Group/Navajo Sandstone	Jurassic	
Glen Canyon Group/Wingate Sandstone	Triassic	
Green River Formation	Paleogene	
Greenhorn Formation	Cretaceous	
Greenhorn Limestone	Cretaceous	
Harding Formation	Ordovician	
Harding Sandstone	Ordovician	
Huerfano Formation	Paleogene	
Iles Formation	Cretaceous	
Laramie Formation	Paleogene, Cretaceous	
Leadville Limestone	Carboniferous	
Lewis Shale	Cretaceous	
Mancos Shale	Cretaceous	
Manitou Limestone	Ordovician	
Maroon Formation	Permian, Carboniferous	
Martin Canyon Beds Formation	Neogene	
McCoy Formation	Carboniferous	
Mesaverde Formation	Paleogene, Cretaceous	
Middle Park Formation	Paleogene	
Minturn Formation	Carboniferous	
Montana Group/Pierre Shale	Cretaceous	
Morrison Formation	Jurassic	
Niobrara Formation	Cretaceous	
North Park Formation	Neogene	
Ohio Creek Formation	Paleogene	
Ouray Formation	Devonian	
Paradox Formation	Carboniferous	
Pawnee Creek Formation	Neogene	
Pierre Shale	Cretaceous	
Poison Canyon Formation	Paleogene	
Priest Canyon Formation	Ordovician	
Purgatoire Formation	Cretaceous	
Raton Formation	Paleogene	
Sangre de Cristo Formation	Carboniferous	
Sawatch Formation	Cambrian	
Shoshone? Formation	Paleogene	
Split Rock Formation	Neogene	
Summerville Formation	Jurassic	
Troublesome Formation	Neogene	
Vermejo Formation	Paleogene	
Wasatch Formation	Paleogene	
Washakie Formation	Paleogene	
Weber Formation	Carboniferous	
White River Formation	Paleogene	
White River Group/Brule Formation	Paleogene	
Williams Fork Formation	Cretaceous	

== See also ==
- Paleontology in Colorado
- Bibliography of Colorado
- Geography of Colorado
- History of Colorado
- Index of Colorado-related articles
- List of Colorado-related lists
- Outline of Colorado
