= Napoleon Pass =

Mountain pass in Colorado, USA

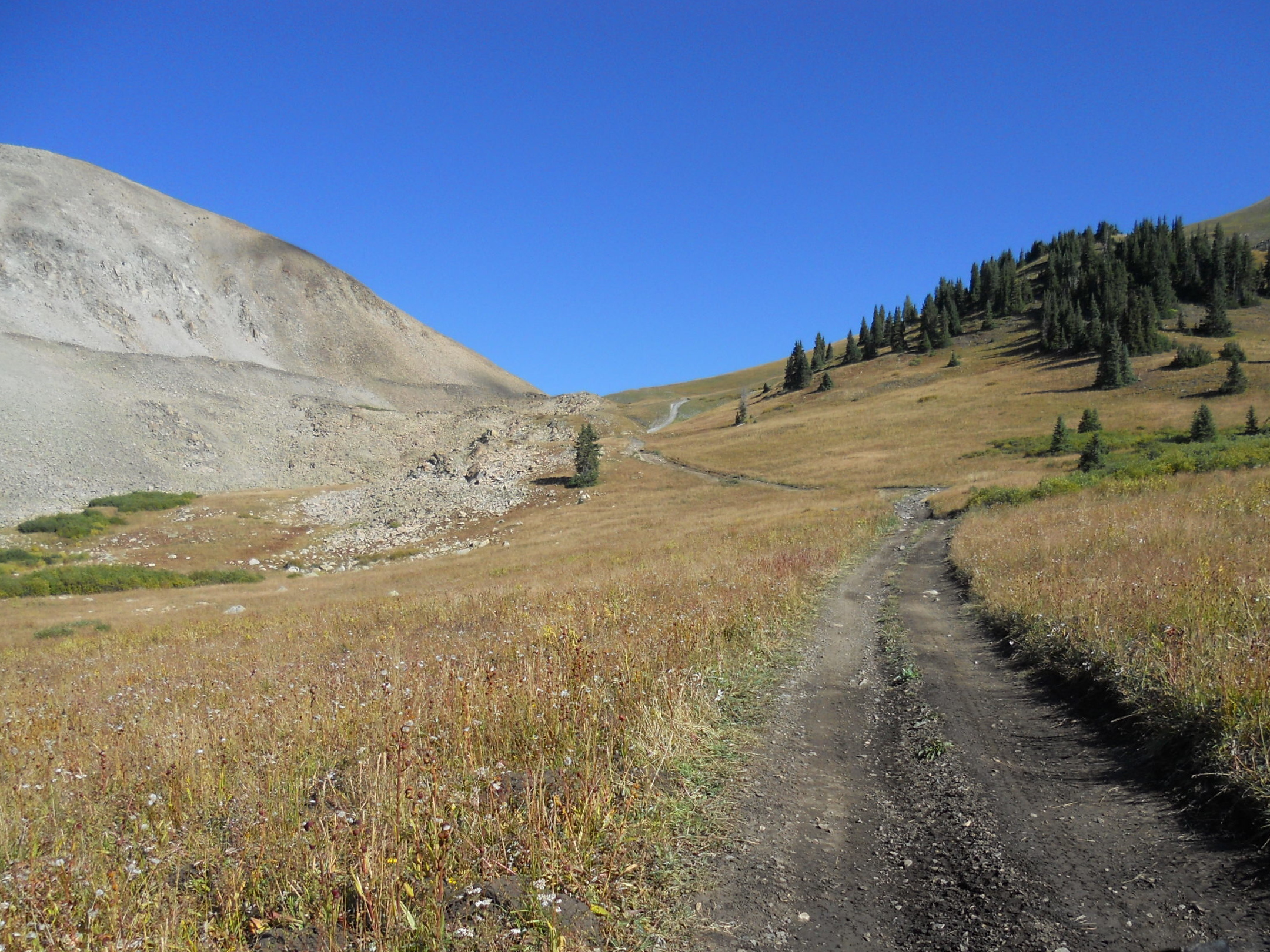
- Napoleon Pass
- Interactive map of Napoleon Pass
- Elevation: 12,034 feet (3,668 m)
- Traversed by: Forest Trail 540

Third Approach
- Location: Gunnison County, Colorado, U.S.
- Range: Sawatch Range
- Coordinates: 38°41′56″N 106°27′37″W
- Topo map: Cumberland Pass

Napoleon Pass (elevation 12,034 feet (3,668 m)) is a high mountain pass in the Sawatch Range of the Rocky Mountains of Colorado. It is located in Gunnison County and in the Gunnison National Forest. The pass is the saddle between Napoleon Mountain to the west and Fitzpatrick Peak to the east and divides the watersheds of Middle Willow Creek to the north and Quartz Creek to the south. Napoleon Pass is traversed by Forest Trail 540 and can be accessed from the towns of Tincup to the north and Pitkin to the south.

Napoleon Pass is named after "Frenchy" A. Napoleon Perrault, a long-time saloon proprietor in nearby Tincup.

The Napoleon Pass wagon road was built in 1882 to connect the mining towns of Tin Cup to the north and Pitkin to the south. This road, along with the nearby Cumberland Pass road, allowed ore from Tincup-area mines to be shipped to the Quartz Station of the Denver & South Park Railroad. The ore was then shipped by rail east through the Alpine Tunnel.

== Geology ==
On Napoleon Pass are Pennsylvanian sedimentary rocks of the Belden and Minturn formations. Magma intruded into these sediments in the Middle Tertiary and today these intrusive granitic rocks form Napoleon Mountain on the west side of the pass. Just 200 feet (61 m) upslope to the east is the Tincup Fault. Along this north–south oriented fault, older Proterozoic gneiss was pushed up above the younger Pennsylvanian rock found at the pass. Today these Proterozoic rocks form Fitzpatrick Peak to the east of the pass. More recently, Pleistocene glaciation sculpted the area and glacial deposits are found on both the north and south sides of the pass.
