= Paleontology in Utah =

Paleontological research in Utah

The location of the state of Utah

Paleontology in Utah refers to paleontological research occurring within or conducted by people from the U.S. state of Utah. Utah has a rich fossil record spanning almost all of the geologic column. During the Precambrian, the area of northeastern Utah now occupied by the Uinta Mountains was a shallow sea which was home to simple microorganisms. During the early Paleozoic Utah was still largely covered in seawater. The state's Paleozoic seas would come to be home to creatures like brachiopods, fishes, and trilobites. During the Permian the state came to resemble the Sahara desert and was home to amphibians, early relatives of mammals, and reptiles. During the Triassic about half of the state was covered by a sea home to creatures like the cephalopod Meekoceras, while dinosaurs whose footprints would later fossilize roamed the forests on land. Sand dunes returned during the Early Jurassic. During the Cretaceous the state was covered by the sea for the last time. The sea gave way to a complex of lakes during the Cenozoic era. Later, these lakes dissipated and the state was home to short-faced bears, bison, musk oxen, saber teeth, and giant ground sloths. Local Native Americans devised myths to explain fossils. Formally trained scientists have been aware of local fossils since at least the late 19th century. Major local finds include the bonebeds of Dinosaur National Monument. The Jurassic dinosaur Allosaurus fragilis is the Utah state fossil.

== Prehistory ==
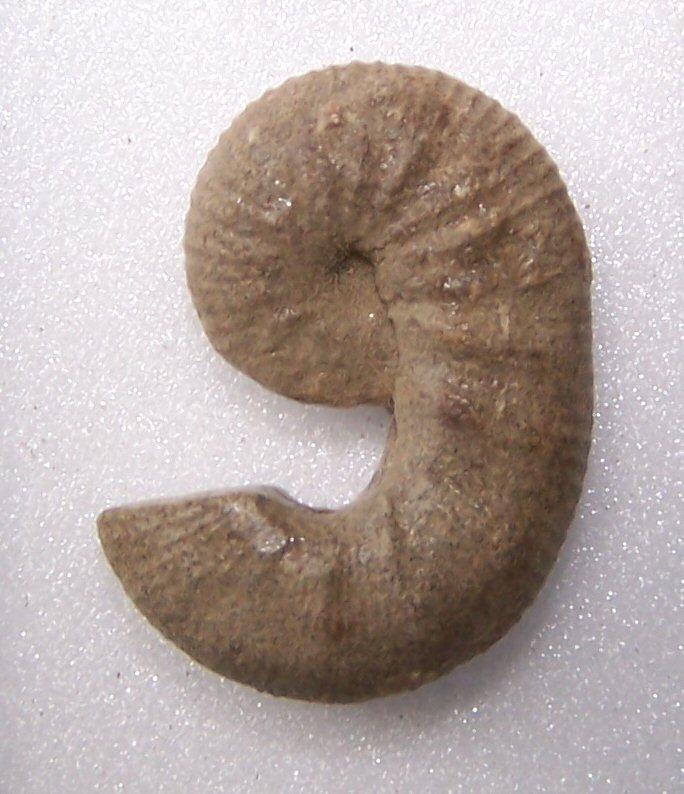
Scaphites.

During the Precambrian, the area of northeastern Utah now occupied by the Uinta Mountains was a shallow sea which was home to simple microorganisms. During the Paleozoic, most of Utah was covered by a shallow sea. The life of Utah during the Cambrian period included brachiopods and trilobites like Elrathia. Cambrian fossils are known from Antelope Springs, the House Range, Millard County in west central Utah. Other Paleozoic marine life included algae, brachiopods, corals, snails, sponges, and trilobites. Marine conditions continued into the Carboniferous. Almost every kind of marine invertebrate could be found in Utah at this time. Fish were also present. This age is the best documented among the state's fossil record. Later, during the Permian period, eastern Utah resembled the modern Sahara desert. Sediments deposited here are now known as the Cedar Mesa Formation. One spectacular fossil trackway from this formation documents a possible predation event that occurred hundreds of millions of years ago. One small trackway of the ichnogenus Stenichnus, left by an early reptile like a protorothyrid or a primitive amphibian like a microsaur, proceeds for a short distance before disappearing when its tracks meet a trackway left by a larger animal. These larger tracks of the ichnogenus Anomalopus were likely left by a predatory pelycosaur who may have eaten the Stenichnus trackmaker.

Sea levels in Utah dropped by the start of the Mesozoic, leaving only the western half of the state submerged. Life was abundant in the sea. In Utah's Triassic marine ecosystems, Meekoceras was an especially common cephalopod. Its remains were preserved at what is now known as "Cephalopod Gulch" near Salt Lake City. A series of floodplains filled the vacated eastern part of the state. On land, the Triassic life included trees similar to those of Petrified Forest National Park. Local dinosaurs left behind footprints that would later fossilize. For the rest of the Mesozoic sea levels in the state would rise and fall. During a dry spell in the Jurassic the state was covered in sand dunes. Later the sea rose and covered much of the state. This sea was home to ammonites, brachiopods, clams, fish, marine reptiles, and snails. On land, Utah was still home to dinosaurs. During the Middle Jurassic, eastern Utah was home to crocodilians. One small individual preserved in sediments now known as the Entrada Sandstone represents the only vertebrate body fossils known from western North America. The Entrada Sandstone also preserves many footprints of mid-to-large sized carnivorous dinosaurs across more than thirty tracksites in the eastern part of the state. These tracksites form "a single vast expanse of tracks covering an area of over 300 square miles", or roughly 1,000 square kilometers. This is known as the Moab megatracksite. During the Late Jurassic a group of small to mid-sized ornithopods left behind another significant series of trackways that have since fossilized. These parallel trackways were laid down in sediments that would later become the Morrison Formation of the state's southeastern region, near the Arizona border. The tracks provide important clues to dinosaur social behavior. During the Cretaceous significant volcanic activity occurred in Utah. The Cretaceous was also the last period in geologic history that Utah was covered in sea water. During the Early Cretaceous Utah was home to the pliosaurid Brachauchenius. Western Interior Seaway researcher Michael J. Everhart has called it a "true 'sea monster'" of its time". Nevertheless, most of the fossils from this time are the preserved remains of contemporary local terrestrial life. Later during the ensuing Late Cretaceous epoch the ammonite Scaphites was especially common in Utah's marine environments.

Into the Cenozoic era, geologic processes elevated the state's topography. Utah was also host to a complex of large lakes. Many of these lakes' inhabitants fossilized. These massive lakes gradually vanished as the Cenozoic era proceeded. The Uinta Basin region near the state's border with neighboring Wyoming has been a source of fossil bird tracks, fish, insects, and leaves dating back to the Eocene epoch of the Cenozoic era. Later in the Cenozoic geologic uplift created the state's Basin and Range physiographic province. More recently, in the Quaternary, the state's many canyons were formed by rivers eroding through uplifted rock. Lake Bonneville formed and then largely dried out as local precipitation decreased. Its remnants are known as Great Salt Lake. Local wildlife included short-faced bears, bison, musk oxen, saber teeth, and giant ground sloths.

== History ==
=== Indigenous interpretations ===
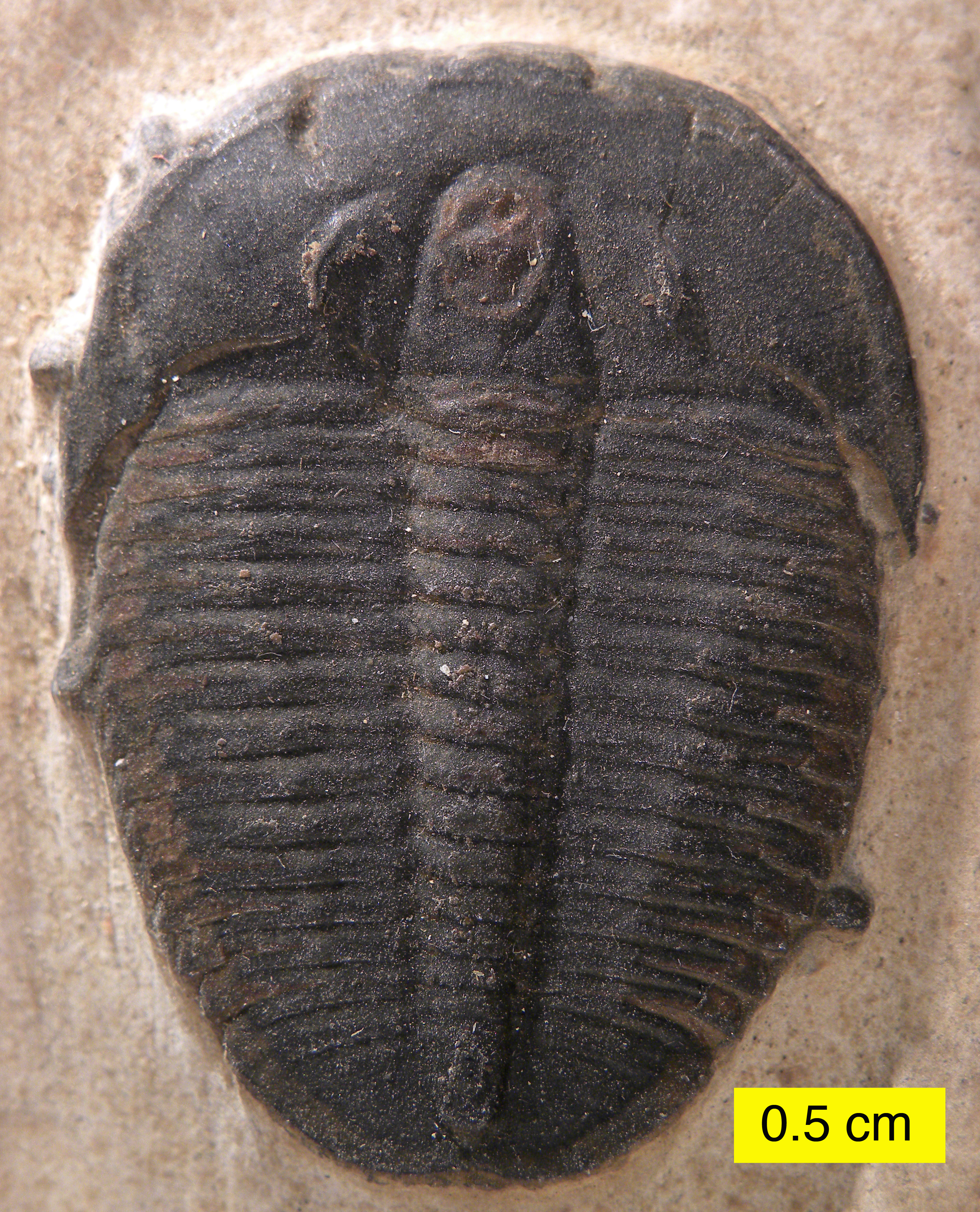
Elrathia.

Near Monticello is a dinosaur tracksite preserved in the Chinle Formation with nearby Indian petroglyphs. Between the years 700 and 1,000 the Fremont culture left petroglyphs of giant lizards up to six feet long next to a small one foot tall human figure at Cub Creek, not far from the Douglas/Carnegie bone beds of Dinosaur National Monument. These petroglyphs may have been inspired by the abundant local dinosaur bones and footprints. A sizable dinosaur tracksite is only 200 yards away. Alternatively, the lizard petroglyphs may have been inspired by fossil footprints of the ichnogenus Brachycheirotherium, which is sometimes accompanied by lizard-like tail drag marks.

Fossils of the Cambrian trilobite Elrathia kingii are common in Utah between Antelope Spring and Deseret. Indigenous people of the area like the Pahvant Utes used them as protective amulets. The Ute traditional name for Elrathia fossils is Timpe khanitza pachavee, which means "little water bug in stone". Utes would fashion amulets from the fossils which were reported to have protective and healing properties. The amulets supposedly helped diphtheria, sore throat and many other kinds of illness. They were also said to protect against bullets. The traditional way of making an Elrathia amulet necklace was to fix thirteen specimens in order of increasing size with green, red, and brown beads made of clay accompanied by two horsehair tassles on a leather thong. The idea of trilobite amulets as having protective power may have been inferred from the resilience of the stone surrounding an animal resembling a "normally vulnerable" water bug. It may also be possible that amulets made of fossils like trilobites or ammonites to physically deflect projectiles.

=== Scientific research ===
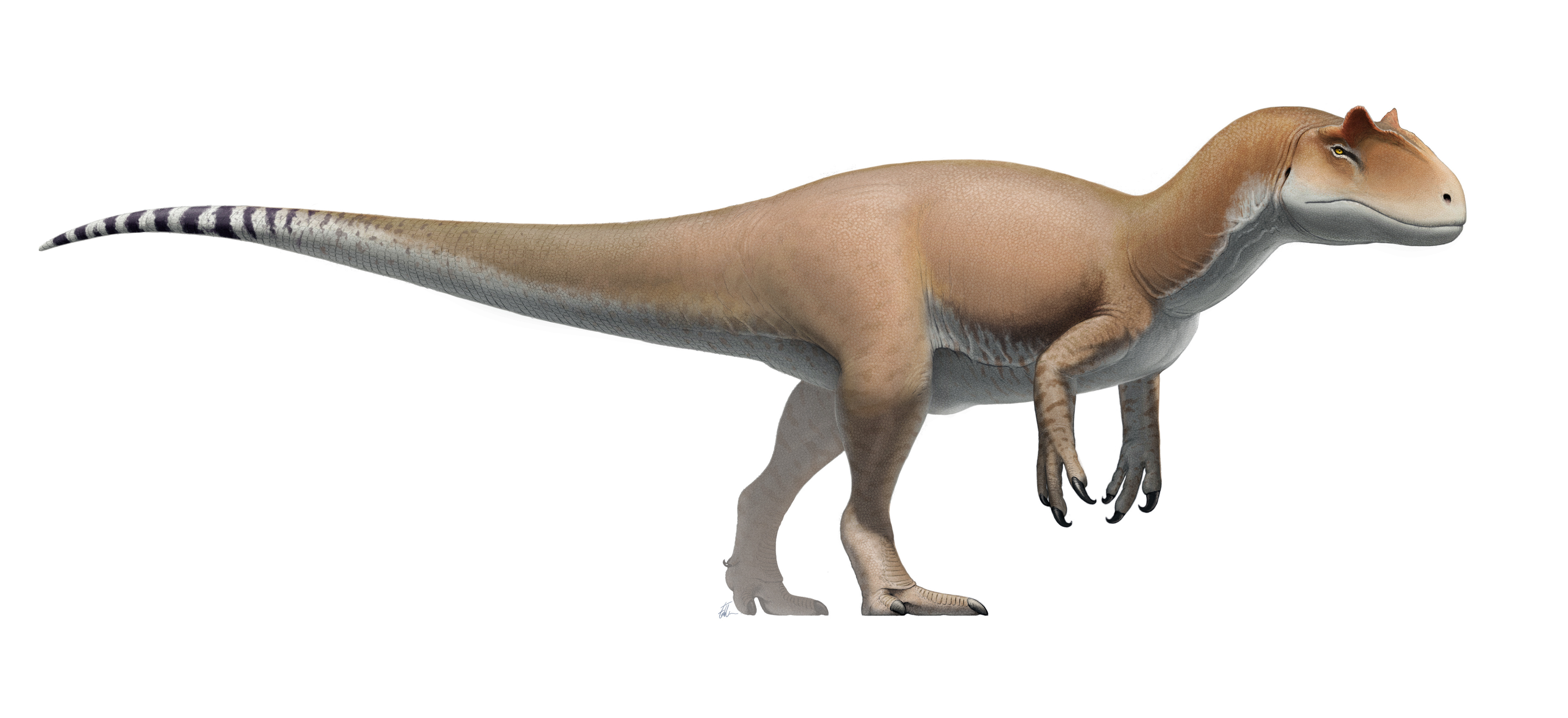
Allosaurus fragilis.

One of the earliest expeditions into Utah occurred during the summer and fall of 1870, when an expedition led by O. C. Marsh collected fossils in on behalf of Yale University. Later, in 1908, paleontologist Earl Douglass was excavating fossils on behalf of the Carnegie Museum of Natural History. Director Holland of the museum visited Douglass's camp that year. In September, Holland suggested that Douglass search for Jurassic dinosaur fossils in the Uinta Mountains north of his camp. Previous surveyors and paleontologists had noted dinosaur fossils of that age there and Holland suspected that they were promising hunting grounds. Douglass agreed and they set off to the Uinta Mountains the next day. Together they found a Diplodocus femur southeast of Split Mountain near the Green River. Encouraged by the discovery of the femur, Douglass returned to the Uinta Mountains the next year. Douglass had little luck during the spring and early part of the summer, but on August 17 he found a series of eight fossil Apatosaurus tail vertebrae, still articulated. On receiving word of the discovery, Holland returned to the site.

Douglass built a home near the Green River and his family moved in from Pittsburgh. He spent the rest of his career in the area excavating fossils. Among his finds were two more adult Apatosaurus and one juvenile, and the partial skeletons of Allosaurus, Barosaurus, Camarasaurus, Camptosaurus, Diplodocus, Dryosaurus, Stegosaurus. Nondinosaurian finds included the crocodilian Goniopholis and the turtle Glyptops. The Carnegie Museum eventually ran out of funding for field work, which terminated in 1922. A year later, Charles Gilmore led an expedition into the area on behalf of the Smithsonian. Gilmore's team discovered the Diplodocus that would later be put on display in the Smithsonian. Later in the year, the University of Utah sent another field team into the area and discovered an Allosaurus skull. From 1924 to 1952 fieldwork had ceased in the area. Paleontologist Ted White ended up restarting fieldwork in the area on behalf of the National Park Service. In 1915 US president Woodrow Wilson declared the quarry and surrounding land Dinosaur National Monument in order to protect it from settlement. Between 1909 and 1923 millions of tons of rocks and fossils had been excavated from the Dinosaur National Monument area. In 1958, the Dinosaur National Monument quarry building was finally completed. Later, in 1988, the Jurassic dinosaur Allosaurus fragilis was designated the Utah state fossil.

== Protected areas ==
- Dinosaur National Monument
- Jurassic National Monument

== People ==
=== Births ===
James A. Jensen was born in Leamington on August 2, 1918.

Robert C. Thorne was born in Ashley on 25 November 1898.

=== Deaths ===
Robert C. Thorne died in Vernal, Utah on 27 May 1960.

== Natural history museums ==
- BYU Earth Science Museum, Provo
- College of Eastern Utah Prehistoric Museum, Price
- John Hutchings Museum of Natural History, Lehi
- Monte L. Bean Life Science Museum, Provo
- Museum of Moab, Moab
- Museum of the San Rafael, Castle Dale
- Natural History Museum of Utah, Salt Lake City
- North American Museum of Ancient Life, Lehi
- St. George Dinosaur Discovery Site at Johnson Farm, St. George
- The Dinosaur Museum, Blanding
- Union Station Natural History Museum, Ogden
- Utah Field House of Natural History, Vernal
- Weber State University Museum of Natural Science, Ogden

== See also ==
- Paleontology in Arizona
- Paleontology in Colorado
- Paleontology in Idaho
- Paleontology in Nevada
- Paleontology in New Mexico
- Paleontology in Wyoming
