= Harding Sandstone =

Geologic formation in Colorado, US

- Stratigraphic range: Ordovician
- Type: Formation
- Underlies: Fremont Formation
- Overlies: Manitou Limestone
- Thickness: 26 to 46 m (85 to 151 ft)

Lithology
- Primary: Sandstone
- Other: Siltstone, shale

Location
- Region: Central Colorado
- Country: United States

Type section
- Named for: Harding’s quarry, Fremont County
- Named by: Charles D. Walcott (1892)

The Harding Sandstone is a geologic formation in Colorado. It preserves fossils dating back to the Ordovician period.

== See also ==
- List of fossiliferous stratigraphic units in Colorado
- Paleontology in Colorado
