= Sangre de Cristo Formation =

Geologic formation in the United States

- Stratigraphic range: Pennsylvanian–Cisuralian
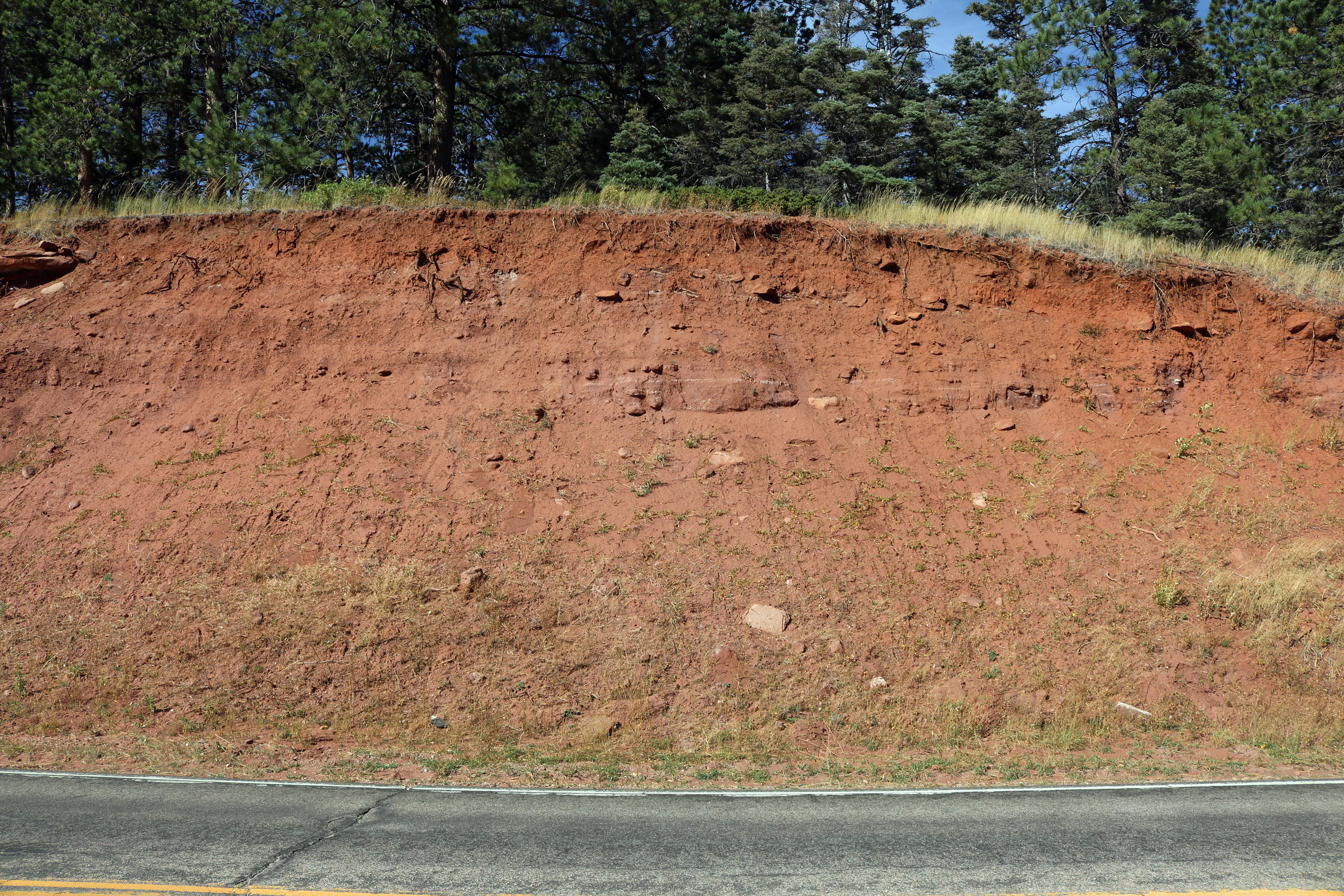
- A roadcut along Colorado State Highway 12 showing the formation
- Type: Formation
- Sub-units: Crestone Conglomerate Member
- Overlies: Minturn Formation
- Thickness: 1,739 m (5,705 ft)

Lithology
- Primary: Sandstone, mudstone
- Other: Conglomerate, limestone

Location
- Coordinates: 38.065°N 105.654°W
- Region: Colorado, New Mexico
- Country: United States

Type section
- Named for: Sangre de Cristo Mountains
- Named by: Hill
- Year defined: 1899
- Sangre de Cristo Formation (the United States) Sangre de Cristo Formation (Colorado)

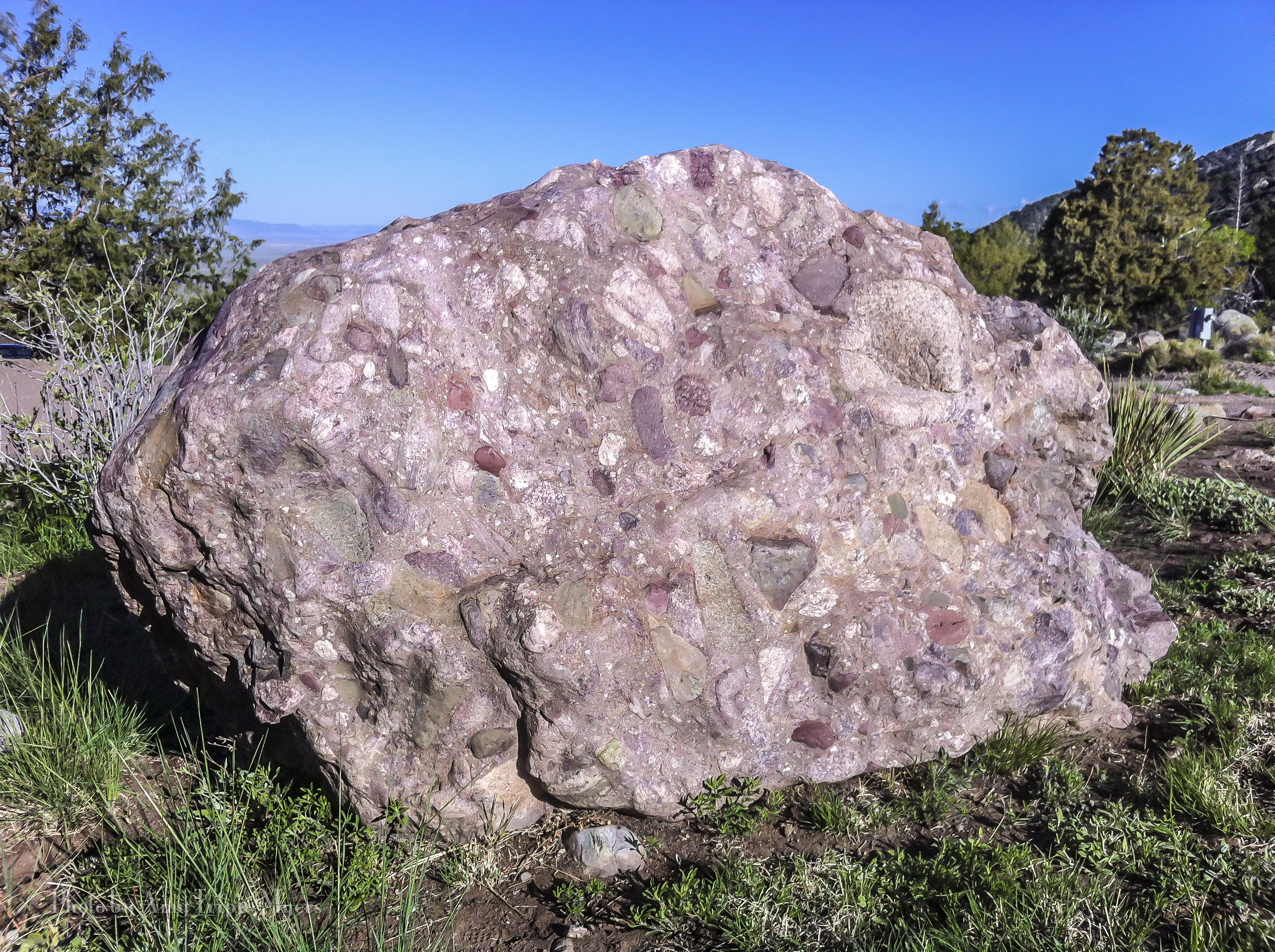
Crestone Conglomerate in Colorado

The Sangre de Cristo Formation is a geologic formation in Colorado and New Mexico. It preserves fossils dating back to the late Pennsylvanian to early Permian.

== Description ==
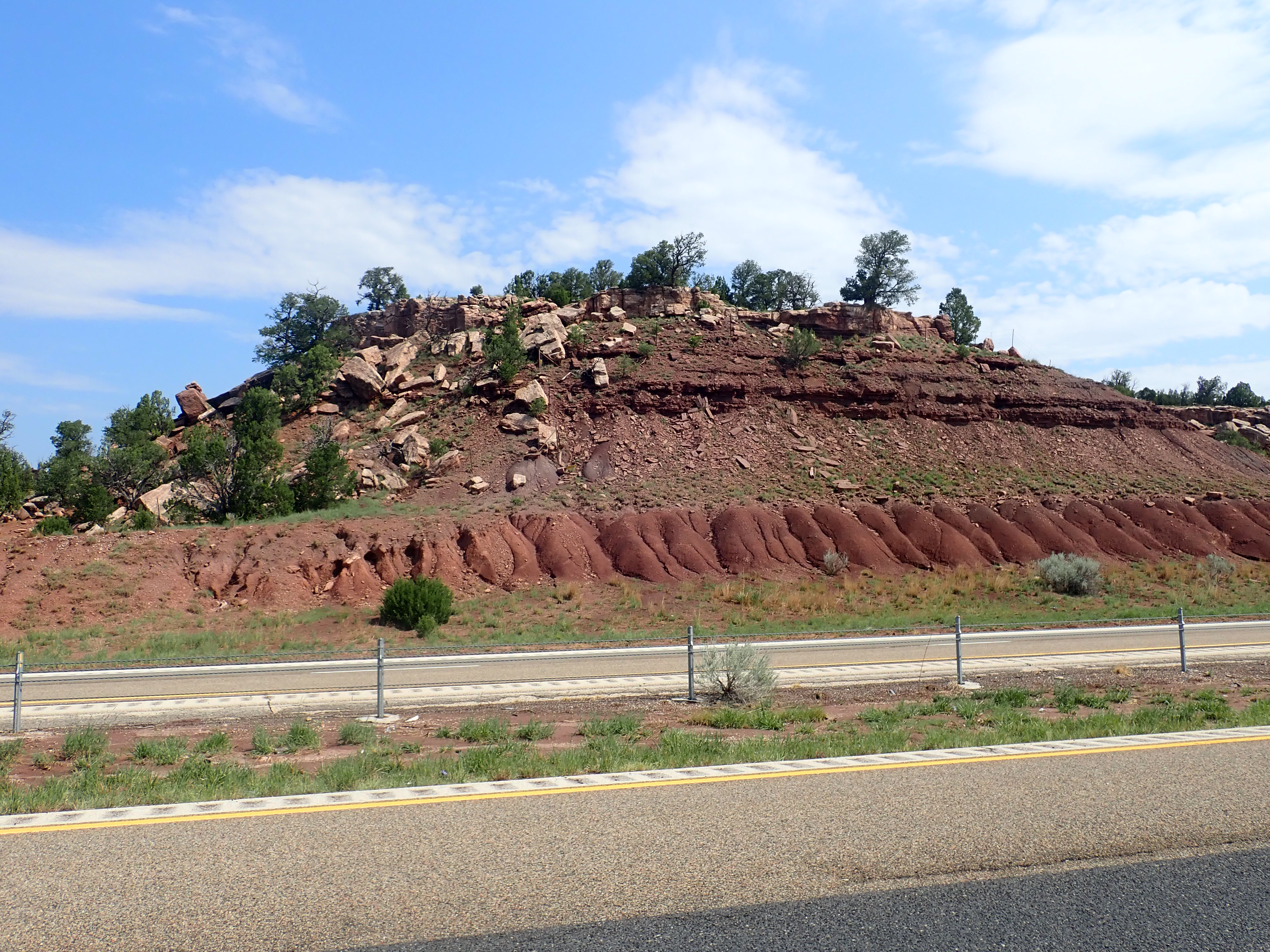
Sangre de Cristo Formation in road cut in Glorieta Pass, New Mexico

The formation is divided into an informal lower member and an upper Crestone Conglomerate Member. The lower informal member consists of about 600–900 meters (2,000–3,000 ft) of red arkosic sandstone, conglomeratic sandstone, siltstone, and shale. These are arranged into fining upwards cycles. The Crestone Conglomerate Member consists of about 1,100–2,000 meters (3,600–6,600 ft) of red conglomerate, conglomeratic sandstone, sandstone, and minor siltstone and shale.

The formation is exposed in the Sangre de Cristo Mountains in both southern Colorado and northern New Mexico. However, the exposures in the southeastern Sangre de Cristo Mountains were deposited in a distinct basin (the Rowe-Mora basin) rather than the central Colorado basin, lack the marine beds found in Colorado, and should probably be assigned instead to the Abo Formation.

== Fossils ==
The informal lower members contains sparse fossiliferous limestone beds containing crinoids, brachiopods, stromatolites, fusulinids, and conodonts.

Outcrops near the headwaters of the Pecos River include tetrapod footprints, identified as Batrachichnus, Limnopus, Ichniotherium, Tambachichnium, Dimetropus, and Dromopus. Less identifiable specimens may be Matthewichnus, Notalacerta, and Hyloidichnus. The assemblage is consistent with a late Artinskian age.

== History of investigation ==
The formation was first described by Hills in 1899. F.A.Melton described the unit in 1925 as the Sangre de Cristo Conglomerate and defined a Crestone Conglomerate Phase (later Crestone Conglomerate Member).

== See also ==
- List of fossiliferous stratigraphic units in Colorado
- Paleontology in Colorado
