= Dotsero =

Volcano in Colorado, United States

Dotsero Crater
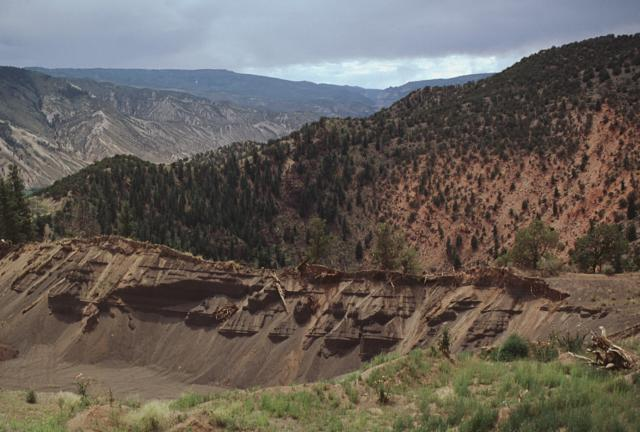
- Dotsero maar in central Colorado near the junction of the Colorado and Eagle rivers.

Highest point
- Elevation: 7,316 ft (2,230 m)
- Coordinates: 39°39′38″N 107°2′6″W

Geography
- Location within Colorado
- Location: Dotsero, Colorado, United States
- Parent range: near Gore Range
- Topo map(s): USGS, Dotsero 7.5-minute quadrangle

Geology
- Rock age: Holocene
- Mountain type: maar
- Rock type: Basalt
- Last eruption: 2200 BC ± 300 years

Dotsero Crater is an elongate, 2,300 ft (700 m) long by 1,300 ft (400 m) wide, maar incised into sedimentary strata of the side of a mountain, called Blowout Hill, and local, irregular, mountainous topography. At an elevation of 7,316 ft (2,230 m), its north rim lies about 330 ft (100 m) higher than its south rim. Dotsero Crater is about 1,300 ft (400 m) deep. It is part of a maar and scoria cone complex in which the associated scoria cones are constructed along a NNE-SSW line on either side of the maar and is perched near the upper edge of steep sided canyons about 1,000 ft (300 m) above the valley floor of the Eagle River. The axis of the maar and scoria cone complex aligns with the axis of a local syncline. Associated with the maar and scoria cones is a lahar and 2 mi (3.2 km)-long lava flow. Dotsero Crater lies northeast of Dotsero, Colorado near the junction of the Colorado River and the Eagle River.

== History of Study ==
In 1888, the Dotsero Crater was first researched and described by P. H. Van Diest as part of his regional work on Colorado volcanic craters. Van Diest's research was followed by R. E. Lakes, along with descriptions of Upper Carboniferous gypsiferous deposits in the same area, in 1890. Lakes noted the highly explosive character of the volcanic deposits of the Dotsero Crater and proposed that it erupted "...within the human period." Much later in 1933, R. E. Landon attempted to establish the age of the Dotsero Crater 's volcanics by studying their relation to the topography of the area, including local terraces of the Eagle River. He concluded that this crater erupted during the Holocene Period; that this crater is a sinkhole; and the Eagle River was dammed by the Dotsero Crater's lava flow. In 1963, F. F. Giegengack studied the pyroclastic deposits and lava flows associated with Dotsero Crater and their relationships to local Quaternary terraces, fans, and deposits. He concluded that this crater erupted during the Late Wisconsin age; its lava flow did not dam the Eagle River; and Dotsero Crater is definitely a volcanic crater. His and earlier research about Dotsero Crater is summarized by J. A. Rizo in 1971.

E. E. Larson and others in 1975 and P. T. Leat and others in 1989 briefly discussed the role of Dotsero Crater as part of regional volcanism in northwest Colorado in terms of both volcano-tectonism and geochemistry. Both papers provide only a very limited descriptions of the primary volcanic deposits at Dotsero Crater, some of which have since been altered or destroyed by either erosion, quarrying, or a combination of both. In 2011, M. C. Rowe and others investigated the compositional evolution of the Dotsero Crater's magmas using the geochemistry and petrography of melt inclusions. They recognized that this crater is a maar and proposed that the eruption began with construction of scoria cones and lava flow, followed by maar-forming activity. Finally, in 2018, M. R. Sweeney and others described in detailed the volcanic deposits and geologic context of Dotsero Crater. From their observations, they concluded that the eruption of Dotsero Crater progressed from initial effusive magmatic volcanism through a period of explosive phreatomagmatic maar-forming volcanism to a final period of explosive magmatic volcanism. They also concluded from the character and distribution of volcanic deposits that the locally irregular and mountainous pre-eruptive topography strongly influenced the accumulation of volcanic deposits around the crater.

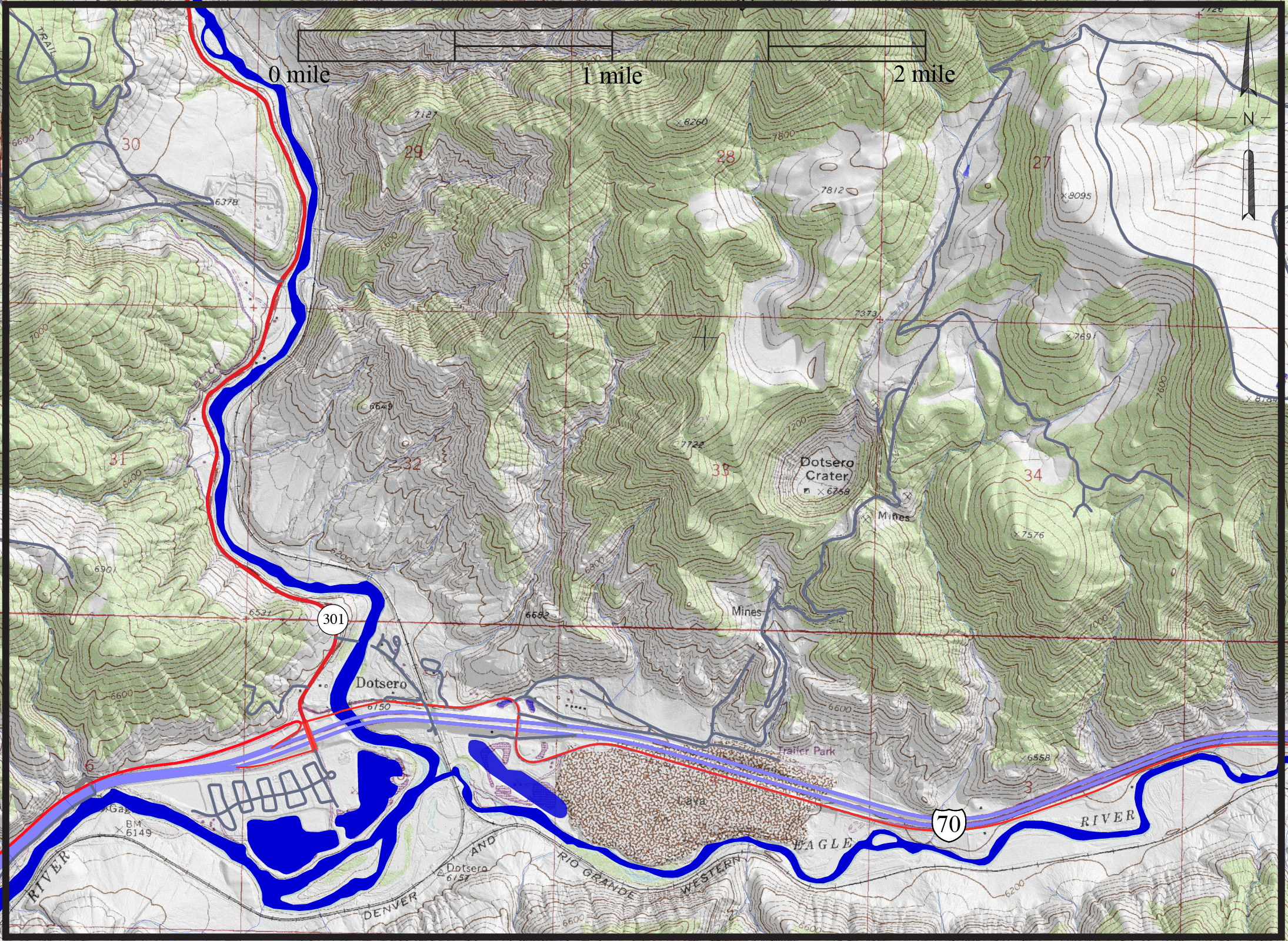
Shaded relief map of Dotsero maar area combined with USGS Dotsero 7.5-minute topographic map

== Geology ==
The most prominent feature of the Dotsero maar and scoria cone complex is the Dotsero Crater. Its northern and southern crater rims are covered by variably welded agglomerate which extend southward into the ravines tributary to the Eagle River Valley. Lithic-rich lapilli tuff comprise the northeastern and southern crater rims. A blanket of lithic-poor lapilli tuff covers the surface as far as 4 mi (6.4 km) to the northeast from the maar. Small scoria cones occur along a NNE-SSW line on either side of the maar.

The maar is excavated into Pennsylvanian sedimentary strata composed of reddish, arkosic sandstones, siltstones, mudrocks, evaporites, minor conglomerates, and rare limestones. Strata of the Maroon Formation are exposed in the present crater wall. Underlying the Maroon Formation are the Eagle Valley Evaporite, Minturn Formation, and Belden Shale. Beneath the floor of the maar, a diatreme filled with volcanic debris and fragmented sedimentary rock extends over a kilometer beneath the surface.

From the Dotsero Crater, small lahars and basaltic lava flows extend down two narrow valleys to the floodplain of the Eagle River. The basaltic lava flow spreads out and covers a portion of the floodplain where they are as much as 35 ft (11 m) thick. These lava flows have diverted the Eagle River to the south side of the valley. Apparently, Dotsero Crater was formed after the eruption of the lava as thick beds of lava are absent in the area of the crater. Interstate 70 cuts across the lava flow. At the base of the volcano is a mobile home park.

== Eruptive Activity ==
The Dotsero maar and scoria cone complex is interpreted to have been formed by a single eruption which occurred in three phases of activity around 2220 BC ± 300. The eruption date is based upon radiocarbon dating of wood found beneath the lava flows. This eruption began with magmatic lava fountaining along a NE-SW trending fissure system that is aligned with the major axis of the Dotsero Crater. The lava fountaining deposited variably welded agglomerates on the northern maar rim and beneath the southern maar rim. This initial phase produced lava flows that filled in two ravines to the south; a small ravine to the east; and covered the floodplain of the Eagle River. The distribution of moderately to densely welded agglomerate suggests multiple vents were active along the NE-SW trending fissure system. The initial phase of this eruption ended with a short-lived explosive phase.

During two phases, the eruption was significantly more explosive as indicated by the phreatomagmatic excavation of a maar and deposition of lapilli tuff and accretionary lapilli. Because of the pre-existing topography, the eruption excavated a crater that possessed northeast and northwest rims that are 33 ft (10 m) higher than the southern and eastern crater rims. The offset rims and shape of the crater strongly controlled the direction and dynamics of explosive activity and the accumulation of lapilli tuff and accretionary lapilli deposits.

Following the formation of the maar, the eruption transitioned back to magmatic activity. This resulted the deposition of scoria as cones. The scoria cones are interpreted to have been result of violent Strombolian eruptions. The duration of the entire eruption from start to finish is unknown.

Dotsero, and all volcanoes that have erupted in the past 10,000 years, are more likely to become active again. The United States Geological Survey considers it a moderate threat to impact air travel if it were to erupt.
