= Matchless Mountain (Colorado) =

Mountain in the American state of Colorado

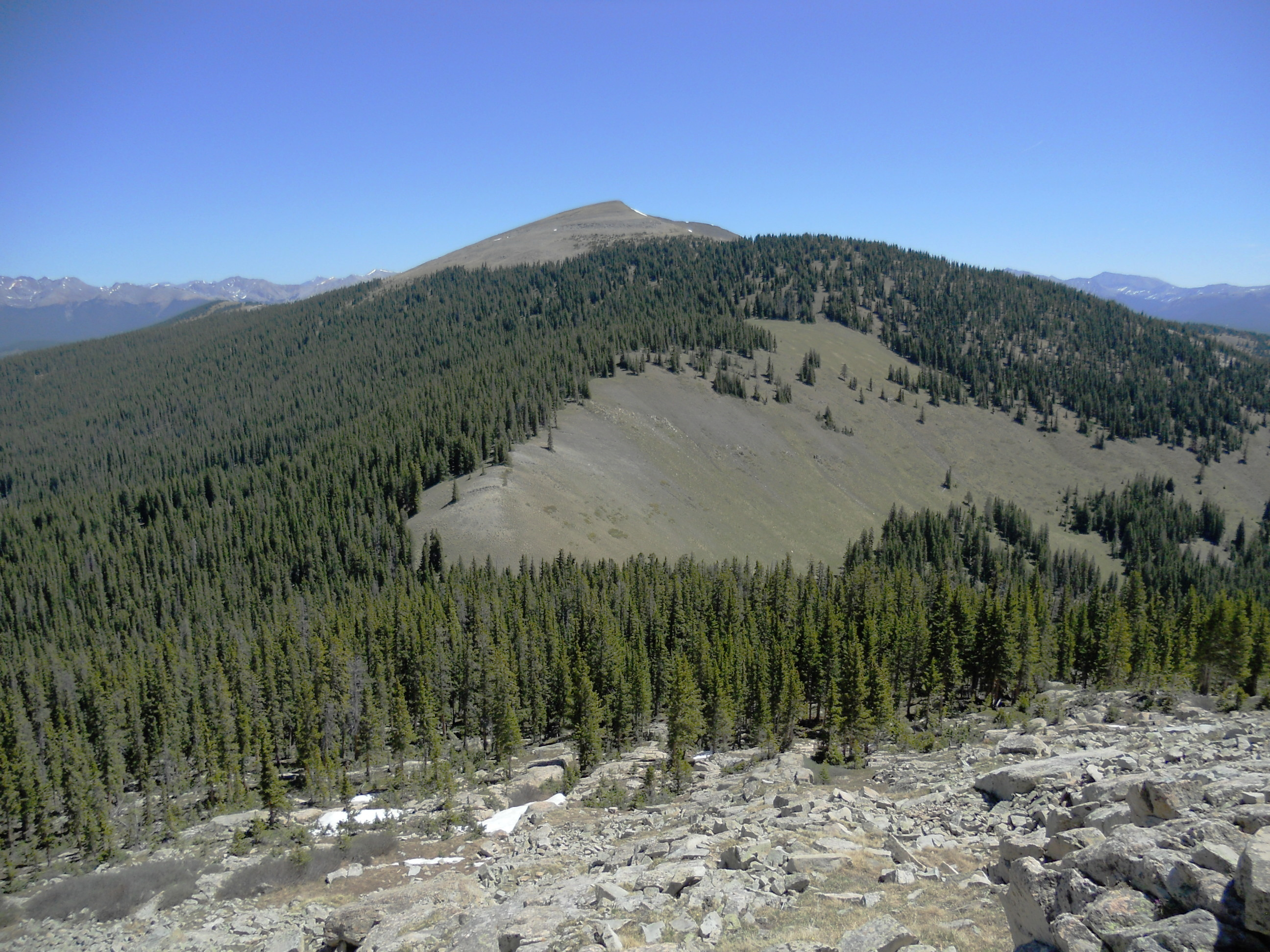
- Matchless Mountain viewed from the southwest.

Highest point
- Elevation: 12,389 ft (3,776 m)
- Prominence: 1,743 ft (531 m)
- Isolation: 4.62 mi (7.44 km)
- Coordinates: 38°50′03″N 106°38′43″W

Geography
- Location within Colorado
- Location: Gunnison County, Colorado, U.S.
- Parent range: Elk Mountains
- Topo map(s): USGS 7.5' topographic map Matchless Mountain

Matchless Mountain is a high mountain summit in the Elk Mountains range of the Rocky Mountains of North America. The 12,389-foot (3,776 m) mountain is located in Gunnison National Forest, 18.3 miles (29.4 km) east-southeast (bearing 98°) of the Town of Crested Butte in Gunnison County, Colorado, United States.

== Geology ==
During the Laramide Orogeny the area near Matchless Mountain was lifted and Precambrian basement rocks and overlying Paleozoic sedimentary rock were raised high above nearby valleys. This uplift resulted in particularly dramatic rock deformation in the area of the mountain. Folding and multiple normal and thrust faults riddle the area. After this uplift approximately 65 to 75 million years ago, there was a long period of erosion. The erosion of uplands and the accumulation of sediments in the valleys largely leveled the landscape. Approximately 30 million years ago, the Precambrian and Paleozoic rocks were intruded by magma resulting in granitic stocks, dikes, and sills. Renewed uplift approximately 10 million years ago raised the region to the heights seen today. Forces of erosion by water and ice have since carved the landscape and sculpted the present Matchless Mountain. Included in these erosional forces was Pleistocene glaciation, and glacial deposits fill Dustin Gulch to the north of the mountain.

At the summit of Matchless Mountain are Lower Paleozoic sedimentary rocks, and the lower slopes of the mountain are a mosaic of older Proterozoic (Precambrian) granites and gneiss and younger Pennsylvanian sedimentary rocks of the Belden and Minturn formations along with Middle Tertiary intrusive granitic rocks.

== Hiking ==
The summit can be reached most easily from the west. The Wheelbarrow Gulch Road (Forest Road 746.1A) leads onto the western slope of Matchless Mountain. A hike to the summit can begin where the road ends at an elevation of (11,000 feet (3,353 m). The summit is a 1-mile (1.6 km), class-2 hike southeast through subalpine forest, meadow, and alpine tundra. The elevation gain is (1,400 feet (427 m)).

== See also ==
- List of Colorado mountain ranges
- List of Colorado mountain summits
  - List of Colorado fourteeners
  - List of Colorado 4000 meter prominent summits
  - List of the most prominent summits of Colorado
- List of Colorado county high points
