= Sawatch Formation =

Geologic formation

- Stratigraphic range: Cambrian
- Type: Formation

Location
- Region: Colorado
- Country: United States

The Sawatch Formation is a geologic formation in eastern Colorado. It is a sedimentary sequence formed approximately 530 million years ago during a marine transgression. It preserves fossils dating back to the Cambrian period. It is composed of glauconitic and quartz-rich sandstone.

== See also ==
- List of fossiliferous stratigraphic units in Colorado
- Paleontology in Colorado
