= Ohio Creek Formation =

Geologic formation in Colorado

- Stratigraphic range: Paleogene
- Type: Formation

Location
- Region: Colorado
- Country: United States

The Ohio Creek Formation is a geologic formation in Colorado. It preserves fossils dating back to the Paleogene period.

== See also ==
- List of fossiliferous stratigraphic units in Colorado
- Paleontology in Colorado
