= Priest Canyon Formation =

Geologic formation in Canada

- Stratigraphic range: Ordovician
- Type: Formation

Location
- Region: Colorado
- Country: United States

The Priest Canyon Formation is a geologic formation in Colorado. It preserves fossils dating back to the Ordovician period.

== See also ==
- List of fossiliferous stratigraphic units in Colorado
- Paleontology in Colorado
