= Poison Canyon Formation =

Geological formation in Colorado and New Mexico

- Stratigraphic range: late Cretaceous–Paleocene
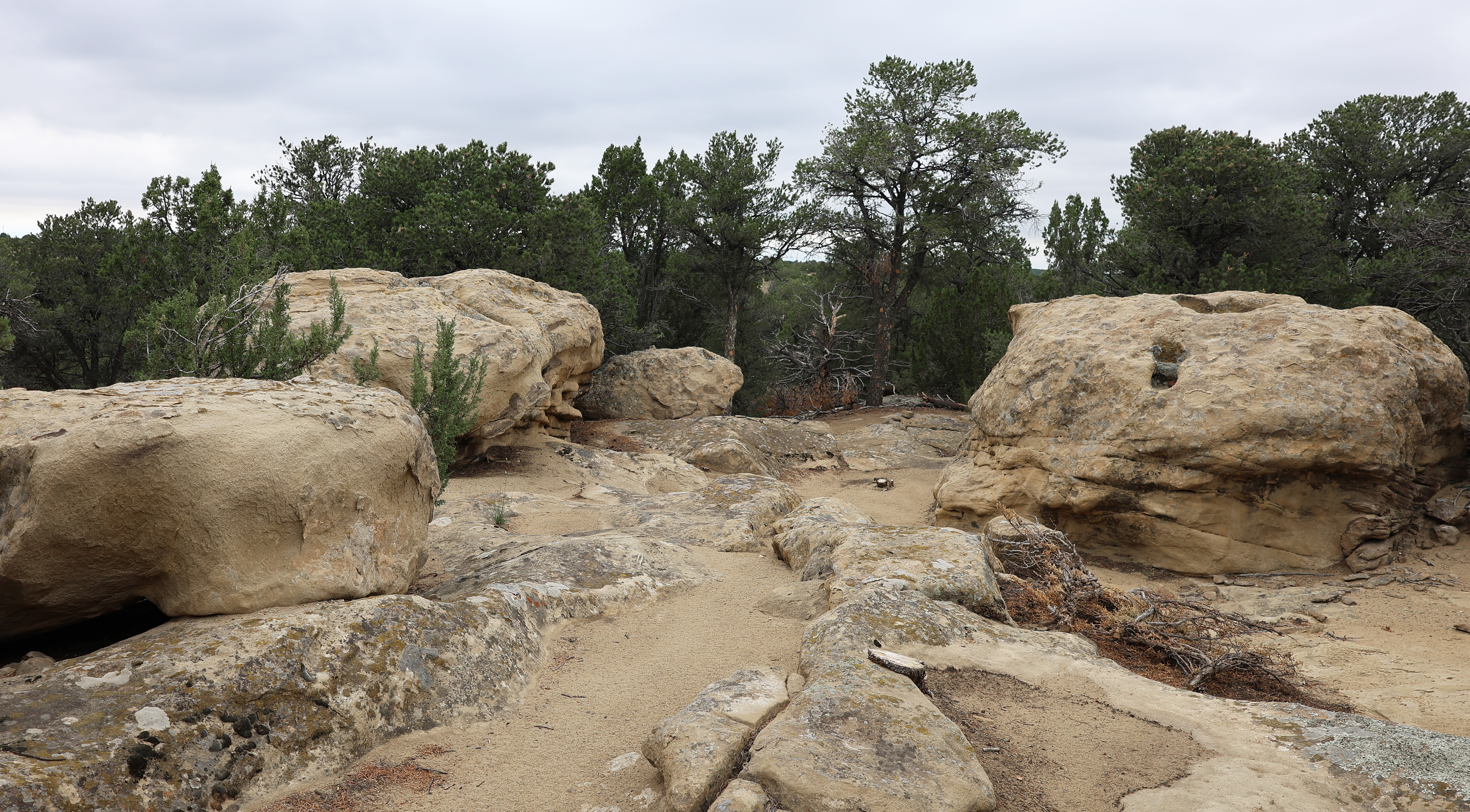
- Rocks in Colorado's Lathrop State Park
- Type: Formation
- Underlies: Cuchara Formation
- Overlies: Raton Formation
- Thickness: 650 feet (200 m)

Lithology
- Primary: Sandstone, mudstone, siltstone

Location
- Coordinates: 37.524°N 105.075°W
- Region: Colorado, New Mexico
- Country: United States

Type section
- Named for: Poison Canyon (37.524°N 105.075°W)
- Named by: R.C. Hills
- Poison Canyon Formation (the United States) Poison Canyon Formation (Colorado)

The Poison Canyon Formation is a geologic formation in the Raton Basin of Colorado and New Mexico. The formation was deposited from the late Cretaceous through the Paleocene.

== Description ==
The Poison Canyon Formation consists of thick sandstone beds separated by beds of mudstone and siltstone. It is found throughout most of the Raton Basin. The sandstone is arkosic and coarse-grained to conglomeratic. The mudstone and siltstone beds weather to yellow, are rich in mica, and are not resistant to erosion. The total thickness of the formation is up to 650 feet (200 m).

The formation grades below into the Raton Formation, with the transition often very gradual, up to 150 feet (46 m). In the western part of the Raton Basin, the formation intertongues with and partially replaces the Raton Formation. The two are distinguished by color (the Raton Formation is gray and the Poison Canyon Formation is yellow to orange), by the absence of arkosic sandstone in the Raton Formation, and by the absence of coal from the Poison Canyon Formation. In addition, river channel deposits in the Raton Formation are up to six times wider and five times deeper than river channels in the Poison Canyon Formation, and the channels in the Poison River Formation tend to be isolated and lack any sheet-like amalgamation.

The Poison Canyon Formation underlies the Cuchara Formation in the northern part of the Raton Basin.

The formation derived its sediments from the San Luis uplift to the southwest and the Wet Mountains uplift to the north and northwest. Its age ranges from late Cretaceous (where the formation partially replaces the Raton Formation) to Paleocene.

== Fossils ==
The Poison Canyon Formation contains sparse fossilized plant remains characteristic of the Paleocene.

== Economic resources ==
The formation is a significant freshwater aquifer in the Canon City, Colorado area.

== History of investigation ==
The unit was first named as the "Poison Canyon conglomerates" by R.C. Hills in 1888. Hills later clarified the definition, separating the uppermost beds of his measured section to the Huerfano Formation.

== See also ==
- List of fossiliferous stratigraphic units in Colorado
- Paleontology in Colorado
