= Manitou Limestone =

Old fossil site in Colorado

Manitou Limestone Formation
- Stratigraphic range: Lower-Middle Ordovician; ~470–468 Ma
- Type: Geological formation
- Sub-units: Manitou Dolomite, Manitou Limestone
- Underlies: Harding Sandstone
- Overlies: Sawatch Formation

Lithology
- Primary: Limestone, dolomite
- Other: sandstone

Location
- Region: southern Colorado
- Country: United States

Type section
- Named for: Manitou Springs, El Paso County, Colorado

The Manitou Limestone is a geologic formation in Colorado. It preserves fossils dating back to the Ordovician period.

== Depositional Environment ==
Because the rocks of the Manitou Dolomites are mostly indeterminate carbonates, the exact depositional environment is unknown. However it was likely shallow water, either lagoon or near-shore, and the many jumbled fossils of trilobite spines and brachiopods suggest that the paleoenvironment may have been prone to storms.

== Paleontology ==
The limestones and dolomites of the Manitou Formation, contain cast/mold-preserved Ordovician-aged marine fossils, including cystoid stems, brachiopods, and trilobites such as Manitouella (Leiostegium?) and Kainella.

== See also ==
- List of fossiliferous stratigraphic units in Colorado
- Paleontology in Colorado
