= Battle Mountain Formation =

Geologic formation in Colorado

- Stratigraphic range: Carboniferous
- Type: Formation

Location
- Region: Colorado
- Country: United States

The Battle Mountain Formation is a geologic formation in Colorado. It preserves fossils dating back to the Carboniferous period.

== See also ==
- List of fossiliferous stratigraphic units in Colorado
- Paleontology in Colorado
