= Trinidad Sandstone =

Geologic formation in New Mexico and Colorado

- Stratigraphic range: Maastrichtian
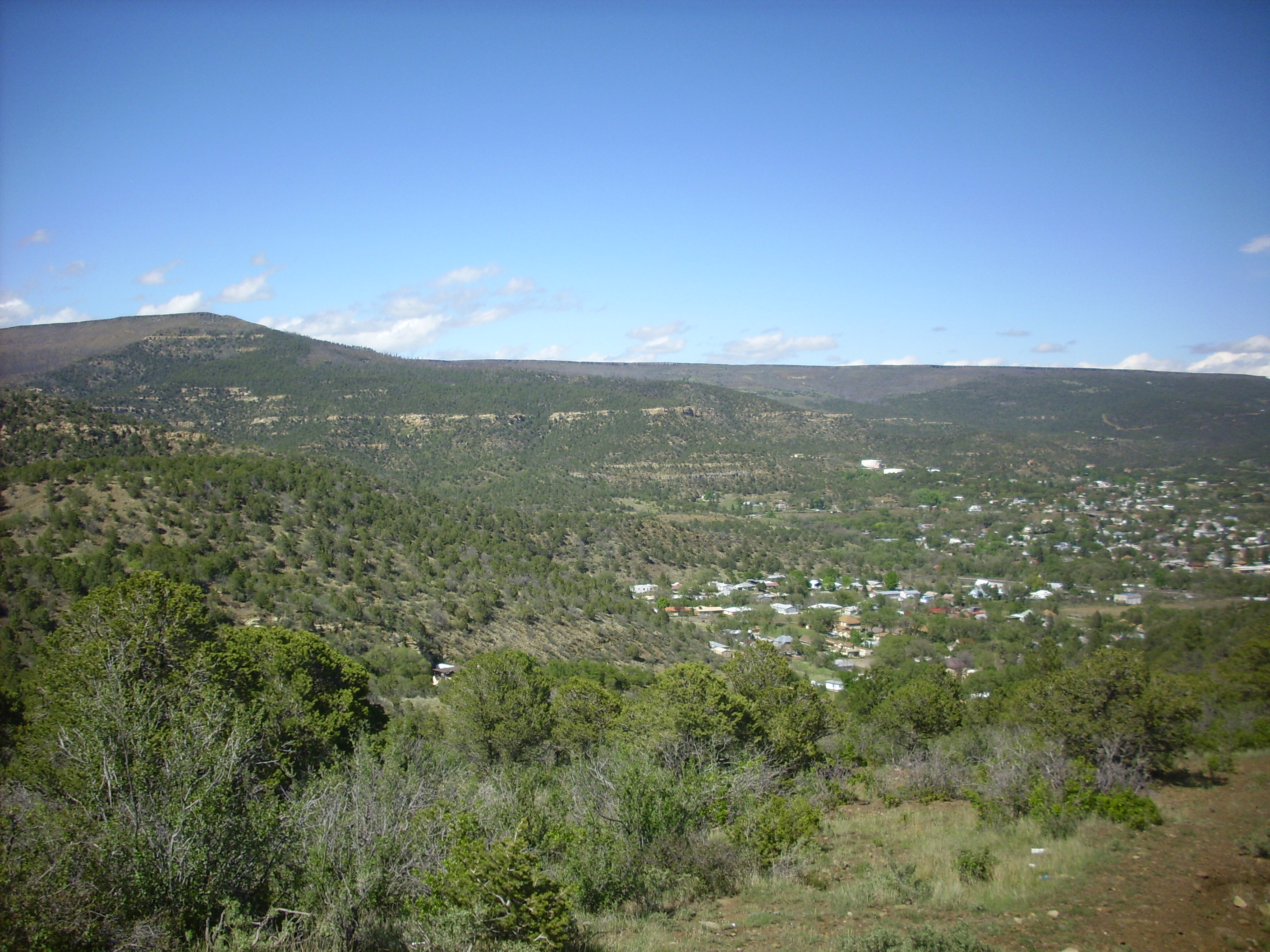
- The Trinidad Sandstone forms a prominent band in the cliffs north of Raton, New Mexico, USA
- Type: Formation
- Underlies: Vermejo Formation
- Overlies: Pierre Shale
- Thickness: 70–300 ft (21–91 m)

Lithology
- Primary: Sandstone

Location
- Coordinates: 37.17°N 104.51°W
- Region: New Mexico; Colorado
- Country: United States

Type section
- Named for: Trinidad, Colorado
- Named by: R.C. Hills
- Year defined: 1899
- Trinidad Sandstone (the United States) Trinidad Sandstone (Colorado)

The Trinidad Sandstone is a geologic formation in northeastern New Mexico and southeastern Colorado. It was formed during the Maastrichtian Age of the Cretaceous Period and contains fossils.

== Description ==
The Trinidad Formation consists of a massive fine- to very fine-grained arkosic sandstone some 70–300 feet (21–91 m) in thickness. It rests conformably on the Pierre Shale and is in turn conformably overlain by the Vermejo Formation.

The formation is interpreted as shore deposits marking the final regression of the Western Interior Seaway from northeastern New Mexico. It is correlative with the Fox Hills Sandstone and the Pictured Cliffs Sandstone.

== Fossils ==
The formation contains trace fossils of Ophiomorpha and, in a few locations, Diplocraterion. "Ladders" of Diplocraterion are over 1 meter (3.3 ft) long in the lower part of the formation at Cerrososo Canyon.

== Economic geology ==
There is potential for natural gas extraction from the Trinidad Sandstone. The gas originates in interbedded coal formations.

== History of investigation ==
The beds making up this unit were originally included in Hayden's Raton Hills group in 1869. The name, Trinidad, was first applied by R.C. Hills in 1899, and W.T. Lee (1917) further refined the definition to include only Hills' "Upper Trinidad".
