= Split Mountain (Utah) =

Mountain in Utah, United States

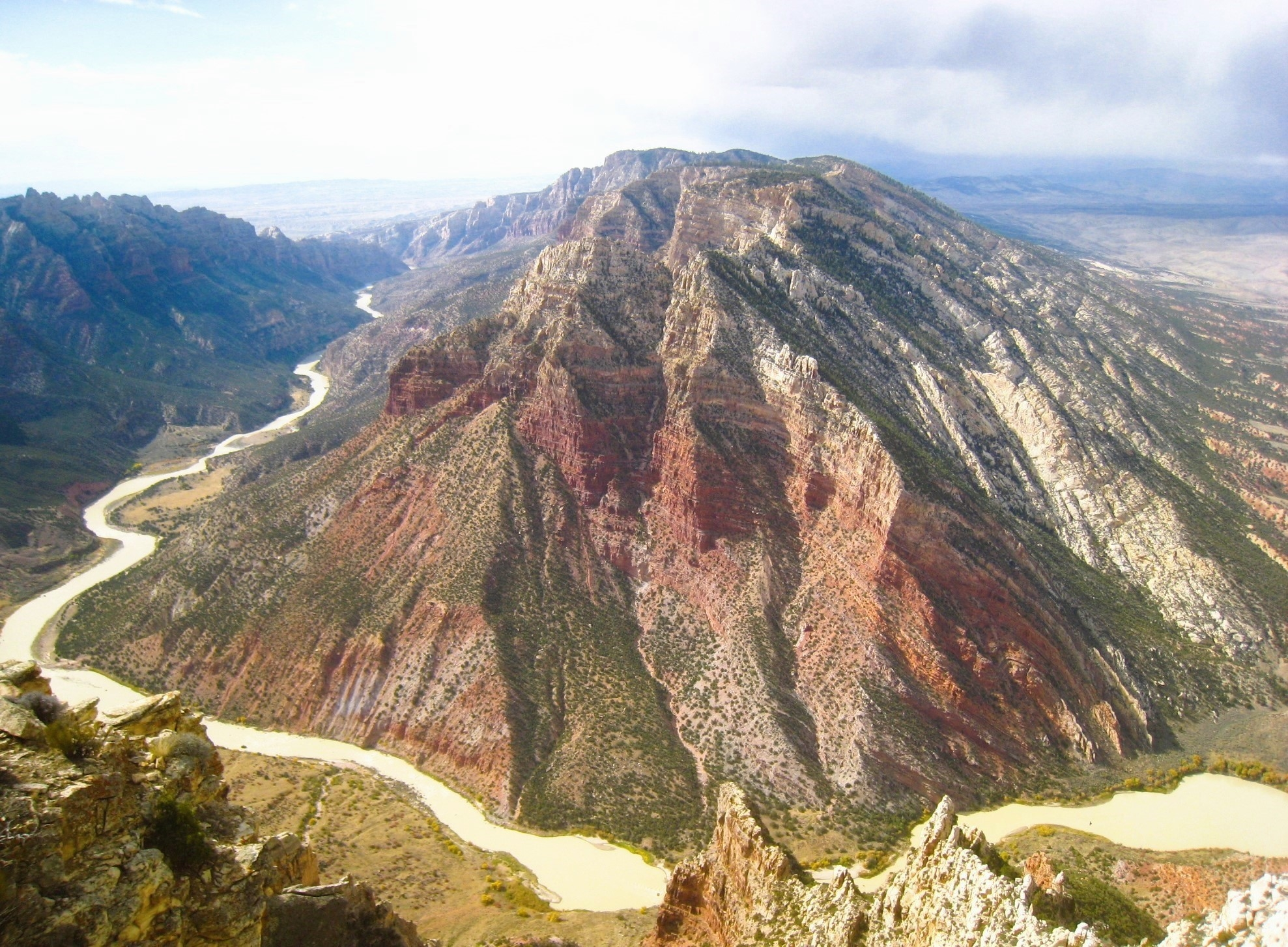
- East aspect, viewed from Ruple Point

Highest point
- Elevation: 7,657 ft (2,334 m)
- Prominence: 1,980 ft (604 m)
- Parent peak: Limber Flag (9,510 ft)
- Isolation: 4.24 mi (6.82 km)
- Coordinates: 40°29′00″N 109°13′12″W

Geography
- Location within Utah Location within the United States
- Country: United States
- State: Utah
- County: Uintah
- Protected area: Dinosaur National Monument
- Parent range: Uinta Mountains
- Topo map: USGS Split Mountain

Geology
- Rock age: Permian-Pennsylvanian
- Rock type: Weber Sandstone

Climbing
- Easiest route: class 2 hiking

Split Mountain is a 7,657-foot-elevation (2,334-meter) summit in Uintah County, Utah, United States.

== Description ==
Split Mountain is located 13 miles (21 km) east of Vernal, Utah, in Dinosaur National Monument and the eastern Uinta Mountains. Precipitation runoff from this double summit mountain drains into the Green River. Topographic relief is significant as the west summit rises 2,800 feet (853 meters) above the river in 1.3 miles (2.1 km). The lower east summit reaches an elevation of 7,519 feet (2,292 m). Split Mountain is composed of Permian-Pennsylvanian cliff-forming Weber Sandstone with Permian slope-forming Park City Formation around the lower base. The reason that the older Weber Sandstone is seemingly above the younger Park City Formation is because Split Mountain is a nearly symmetrical anticline. This landform's toponym has been officially adopted by the United States Board on Geographic Names. It is named in association with Split Mountain Canyon, in turn named by John Wesley Powell in 1869 as his expedition passed through this mountain which the Green River split via erosion.

== Climate ==
Spring and fall are the most favorable seasons to visit Split Mountain. According to the Köppen climate classification system, it is located in a semi-arid climate zone, with temperatures averaging between 0 °F to 30 °F in January, and 50 °F to 100 °F in July. Typical of high deserts, summer temperatures can be exceedingly hot, while winter temperatures can be very cold. Snowfall is common, but the snow melts rapidly in the arid and sunny climate. Rainfall is very low, and the evaporation rate classifies the area as desert, even though the rainfall exceeds 10 inches.

== Gallery ==
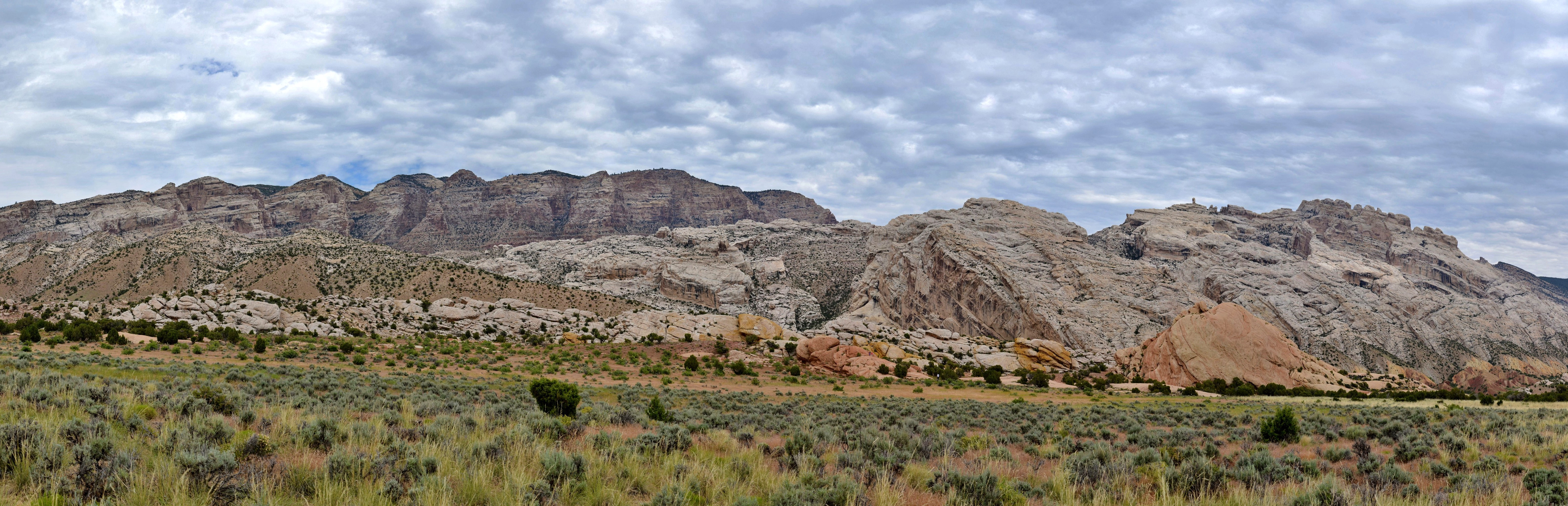
South aspect of Split Mountain, West summit to left of center in back.

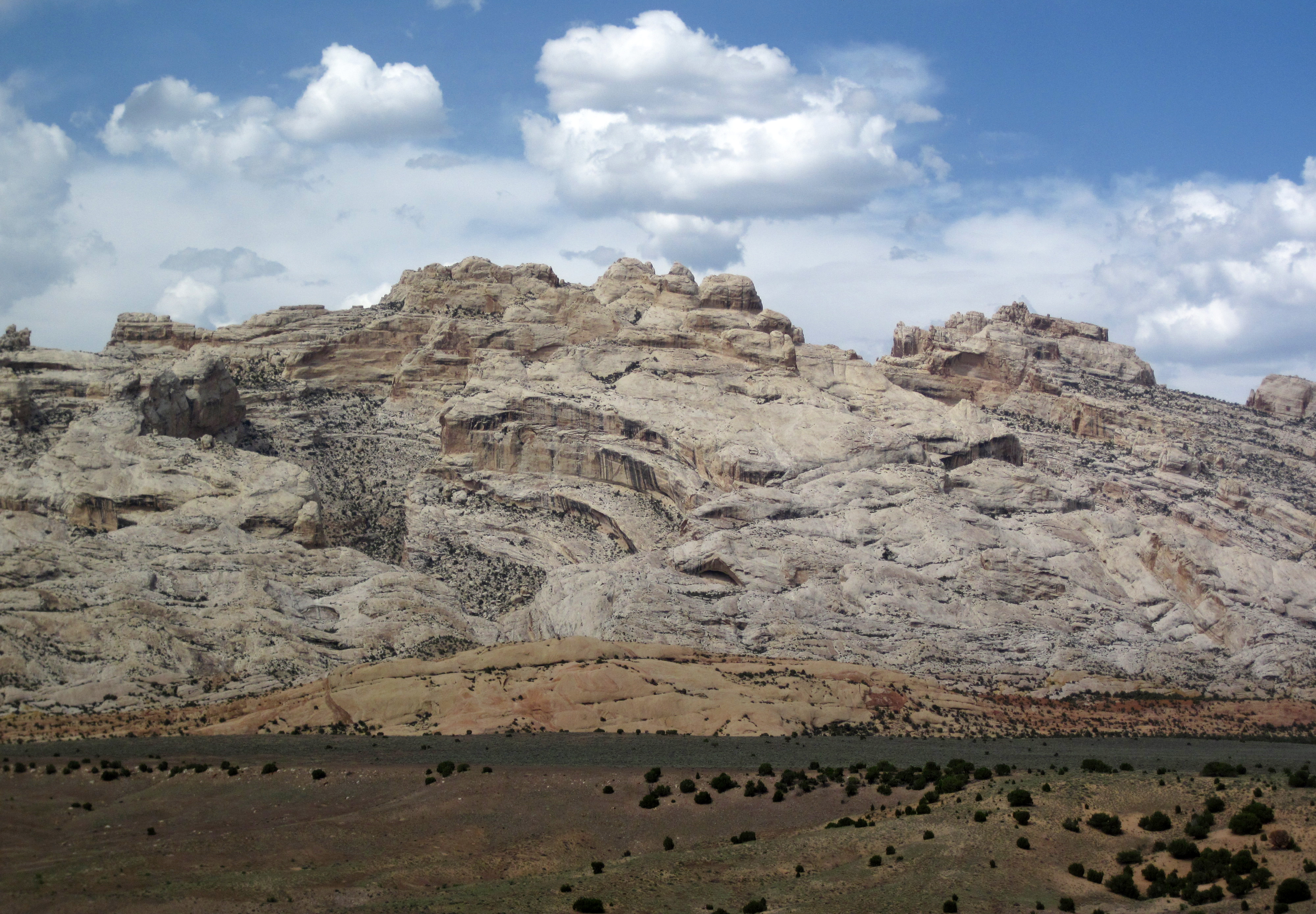
Weber Sandstone of Split Mountain

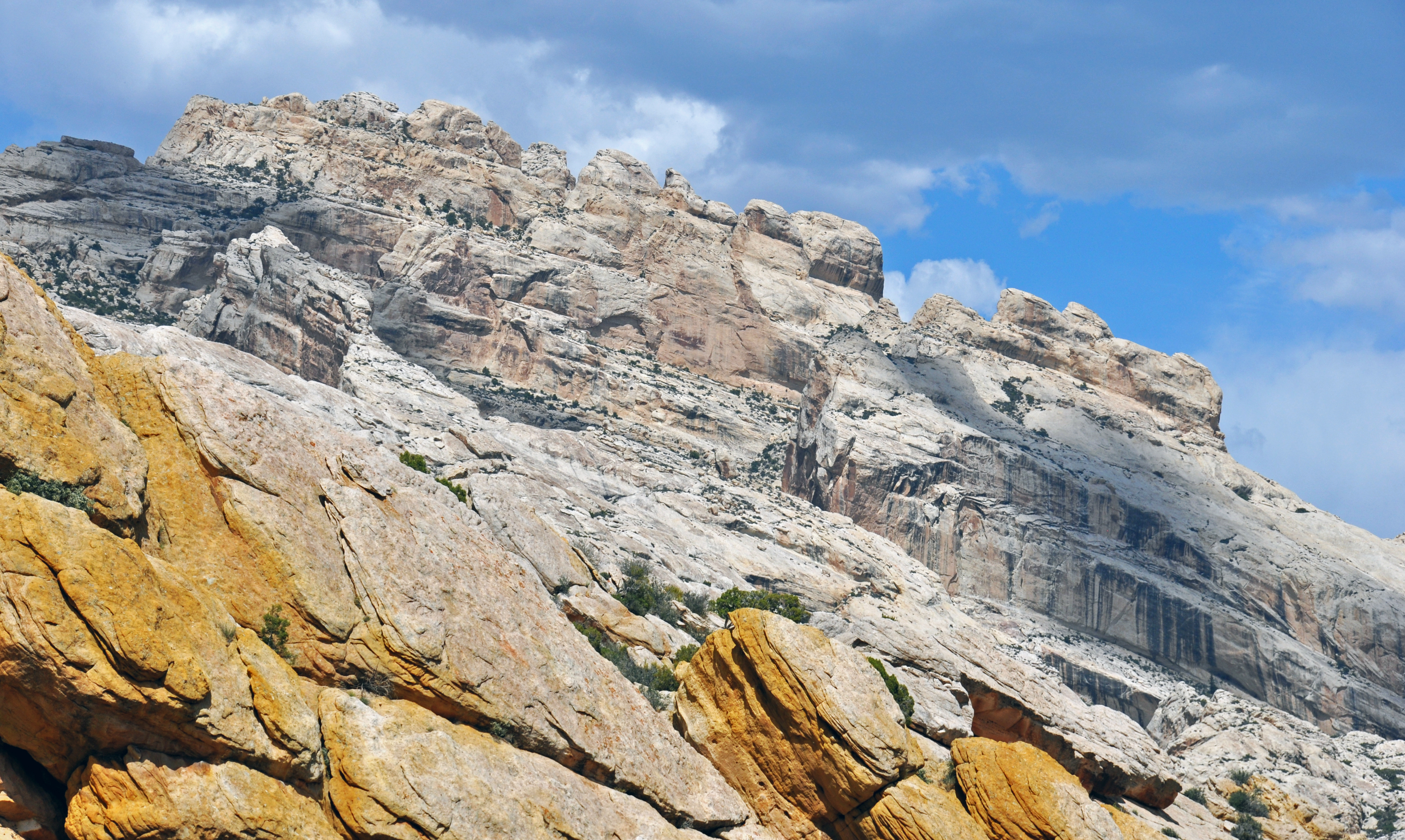
Weber Sandstone of Split Mountain

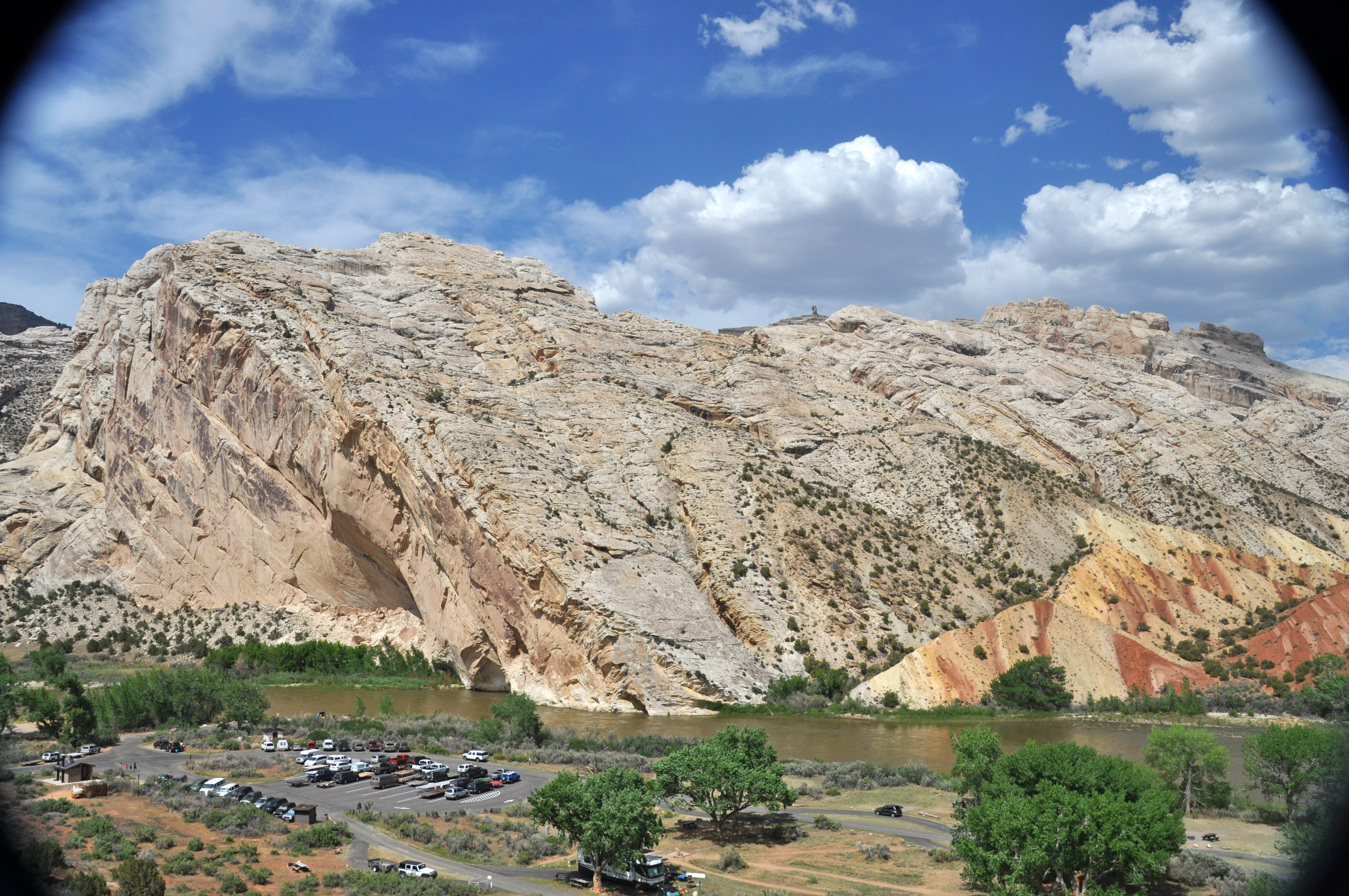
Weber Sandstone of Split Mountain with Split Mountain Campground in foreground

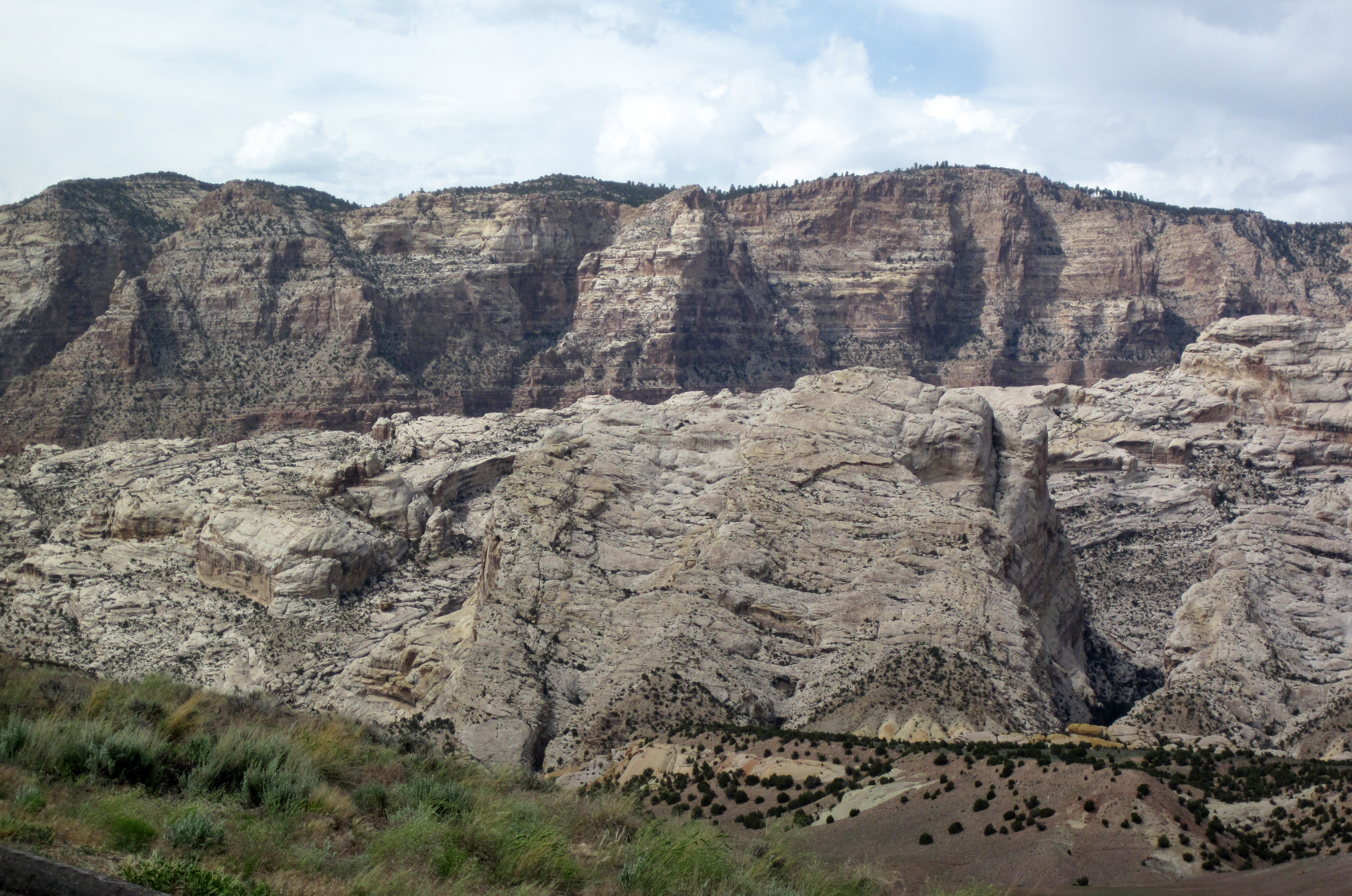
Split Mountain

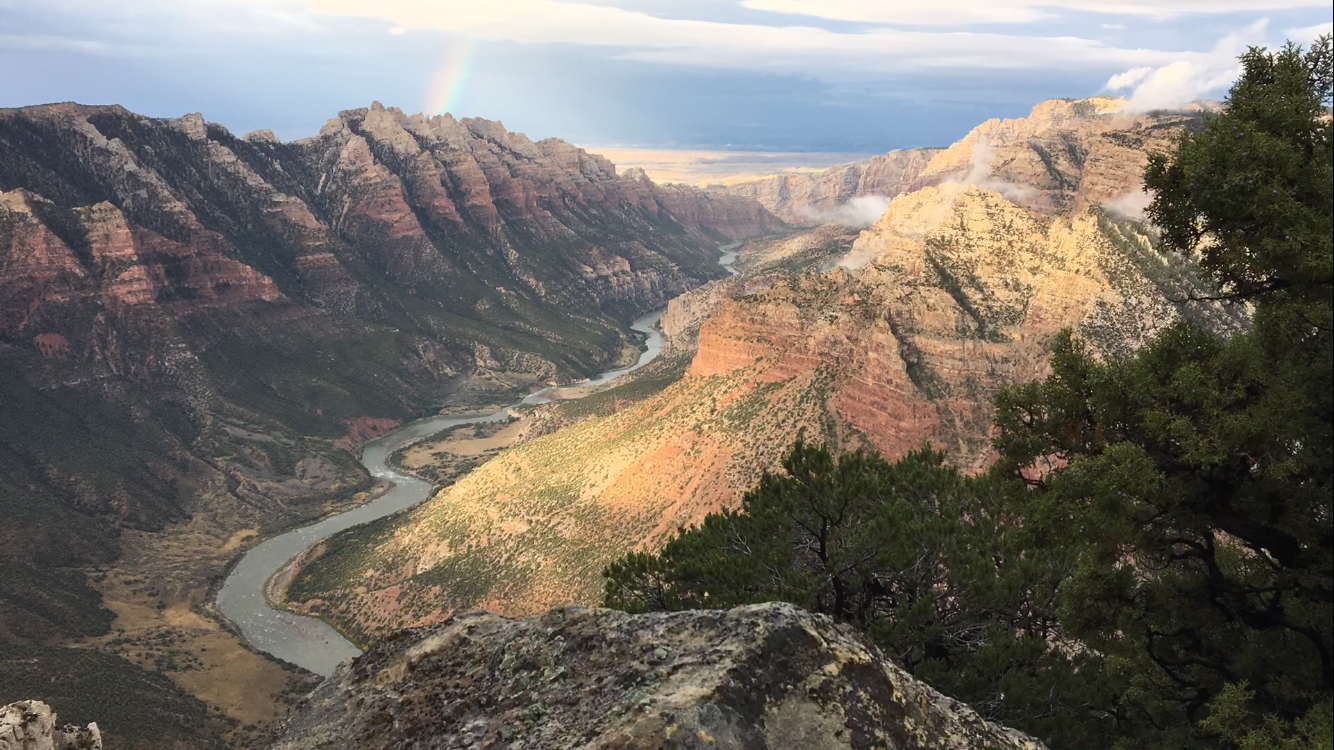
Green River in Split Mountain Canyon
