= Split Mountain =

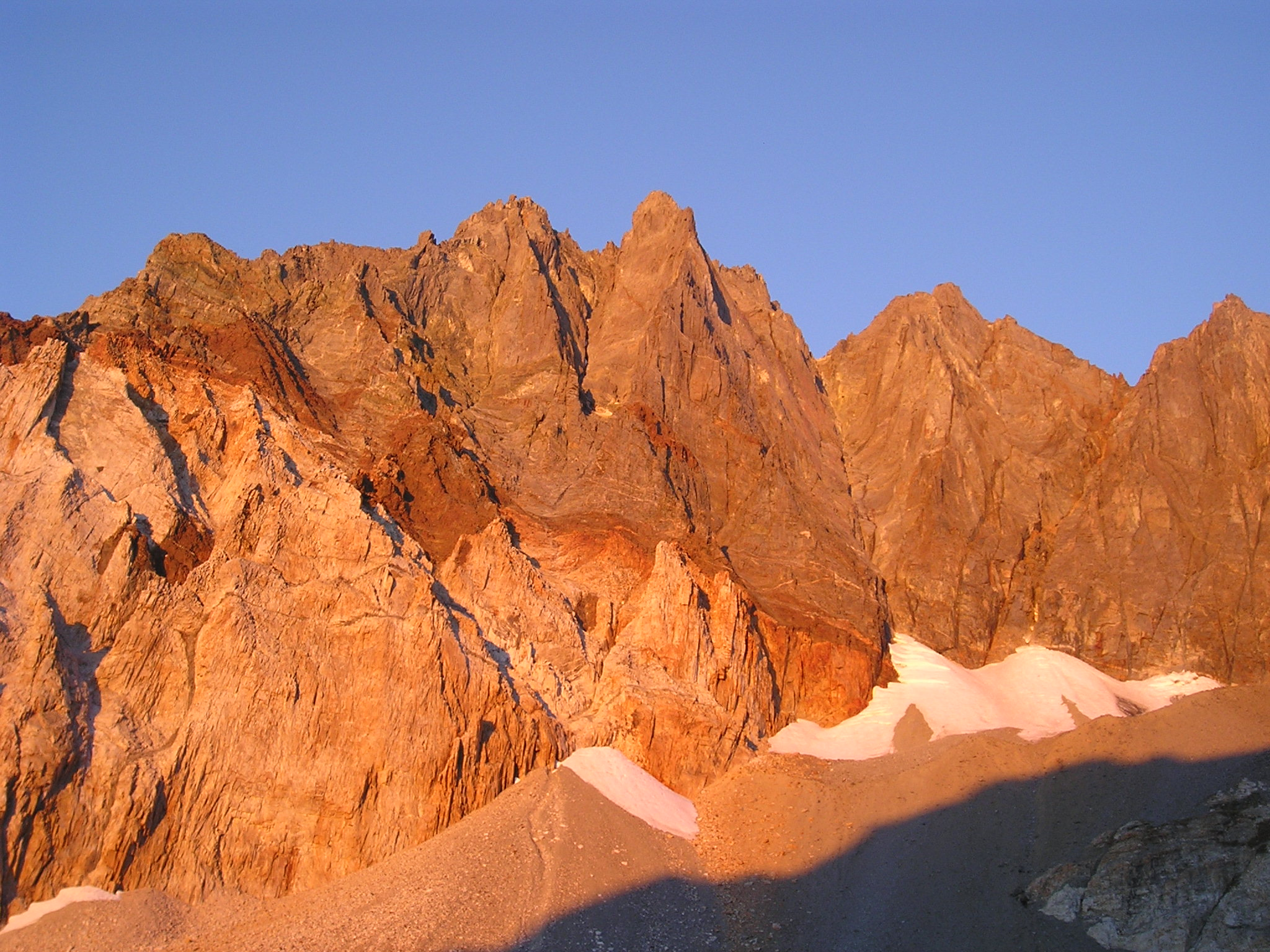
Split Mountain in the Sierra Nevada, California, USA

Split Mountain (or similar) is the name of seventeen different peaks in the United States:

Name	USGS link	State	County	USGS map	Coordinates	Elevation	
Splitrock Mountain		Alabama	Jackson	Paint Rock	34°38′36″N 086°17′30″W	1,499 ft	457 m
Split Top Mountain		Alaska	Aleutians West (CA)	Unalaska C-2	53°56′00″N 166°25′56″W	1,621 ft	494 m
Split Mountain		California	Kern	Kernville	35°45′04″N 118°28′56″W	6,690 ft	2,040 m
Split Mountain		California	Inyo	Split Mountain	37°01′15″N 118°25′20″W	14,052 ft	4,283 m
Split Mountain		California	San Diego	Borrego Mountain SE	33°00′17″N 116°07′11″W	1,358 ft	414 m
Split Mountain		Montana	Glacier	Mount Stimson	48°35′53″N 113°32′21″W	8,753 ft	2,668 m
Split Mountain		Montana	Pondera	Fish Lake	48°08′26″N 112°48′51″W	6,191 ft	1,887 m
Split Mountain		Nevada	Esmeralda	Split Mountain	37°42′43″N 117°27′15″W	6,253 ft	1,906 m
Split Mountain Cairn		Nevada	Humboldt	Bilk Creek Reservoir	41°44′14″N 118°26′18″W	5,157 ft	1,572 m
Split Rock Mountain		New York	Essex	Underwood	44°06′59″N 073°38′42″W	1,949 ft	594 m
Split Rock Mountain		New York	Essex	Vergennes West	44°14′50″N 073°21′13″W	1,027 ft	313 m
Split Mountain		North Carolina	Haywood	Fines Creek	35°42′54″N 082°55′09″W	4,265 ft	1,300 m
Split Mountain		Oregon	Coos	Kenyon Mountain	43°07′12″N 123°52′22″W	2,418 ft	737 m
Split Mountain		Texas	Medina	Flatrock Crossing	29°35′53″N 099°22′35″W	1,982 ft	604 m
Split Mountain		Texas	Medina	Texas Mountain	29°35′02″N 099°19′04″W	1,795 ft	547 m
Split Mountain		Utah	Uintah	Split Mountain	40°29′00″N 109°13′14″W	7,526 ft	2,294 m
Split Mountain		Wyoming	Sublette	Gannett Peak	43°09′51″N 109°40′21″W	13,133 ft	4,003 m

There is also a Split Mountain in Canada:

- Split Mountain (British Columbia)
