= Raton Formation =

Geologic formation in New Mexico and Colorado, USA

- Stratigraphic range: upper Cretaceous–Paleocene
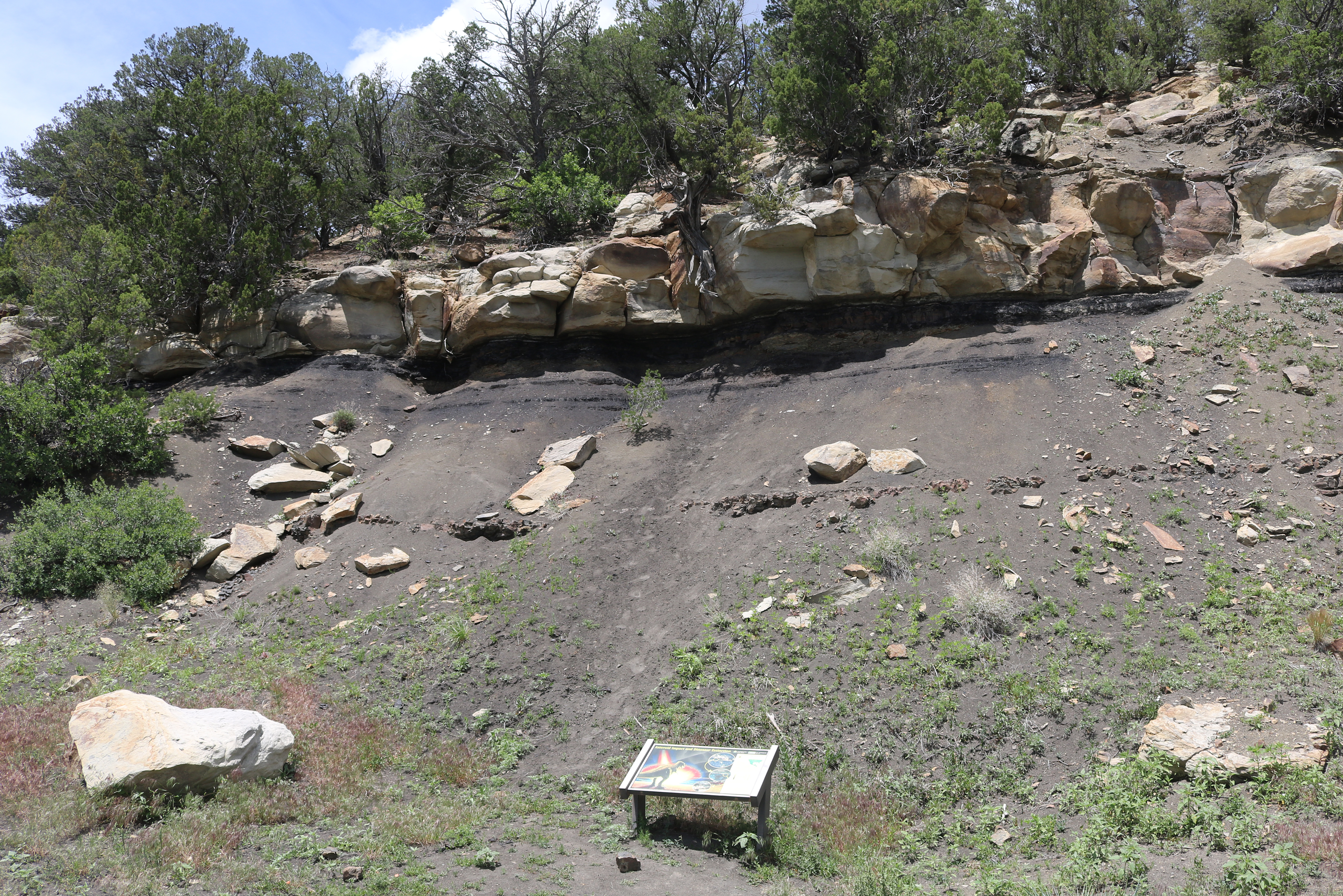
- The Cretaceous–Paleogene boundary in Trinidad Lake State Park, near Trinidad, Colorado
- Type: Formation
- Underlies: Poison Canyon Formation
- Overlies: Vermejo Formation
- Thickness: 1,140 feet (350 m)

Lithology
- Primary: Sandstone, conglomerate
- Other: Coal, shale

Location
- Coordinates: 36.96°N 104.47°W
- Region: New Mexico
- Country: United States

Type section
- Named for: Raton Mesa
- Named by: F.V. Hayden
- Year defined: 1869
- Raton Formation (the United States) Raton Formation (New Mexico)

The Raton Formation is a geological formation of Upper Cretaceous and Paleocene age which outcrops in the Raton Basin of northeast New Mexico and southeast Colorado.

== Description ==
The formation consists of coal with carbonaceous shale, brown to buff sandstone, and conglomerate (usually at the base). It is about 1,140 feet (350 m) thick at the type locality. The formation unconformably overlies the Vermejo Formation, and unconformably (?) underlies the Poison Canyon Formation. It is of late Cretaceous to Paleocene age.

The formation can be divided into three informal members. The lowest member is a basal sandstone and conglomerate of quartzite, chert and gneiss pebbles and cobbles in a coarse-grained quartzose to arkosic sandstone matrix. The middle member is fine to coarse grained sandstone, with some siltstone, mudstone, and coal. The upper member is coal-bearing and contains sandstone, siltstone, mudstone, shale, and mineable coal.

Numerous igneous intrusions, ranging in age from 6.7 to 29.5 million years old, are found in the formation. These range from dikes and that have locally altered the coal to sills that preferentially penetrated along coal beds and destroyed the coal. It is likely that hundreds of millions of tons of the original coal deposits were destroyed this way.

== Cretaceous-Paleogene boundary ==
Because the Raton Formation is a well-preserved sequence of rocks spanning the Cretaceous-Paleogene boundary, it has been studied for evidence of a large meteor impact at the end of the Cretaceous that is thought to have caused the Cretaceous–Paleogene extinction event. The boundary is represented by a 1-cm thick tonstein clay layer which has been found to contain anomalously high concentrations of iridium. The boundary clay layer is accessible to the public at Trinidad Lake State Park, among other places in the Raton Basin.

== Fossils ==
The formation contains fossils of the green algae Pediastrum and Scenedesmus characteristic of a freshwater lake or pond environment. Plant fossils suggest the formation was deposited in a tropical rain forest environment, with the presence of Icacinicaryites corruga and the understory fern Cyclosorus indicating a very warm environment.

== Economic resources ==
The Raton Formation contains economically important deposits of coal. These were first discovered in 1841 and mining began in 1873. Mining declined precipitously in the mid-20th century with the decline of the steel industry using the coal, but the formation is now being developed for coalbed methane. Reserves in 1999 were estimated at 18.4 trillion cubic feet (520 billion cubic meters). Production at that time was 17.5 million cubic feet per day (500,000 cubic meters per day) from 85 wells.

== History of investigation ==
The Raton Formation was originally named "Raton Hills Group" by Ferdinand Vandeveer Hayden in 1869 for coal beds in the Raton Hills in Colfax County, New Mexico. In 1913, W.T. Lee changed the name to Raton Formation.
