= Stenichnus =

Trace fossil classification
- Ichnogenus: †Stenichnus; Gilmore, 1927

Trace fossil

Stenichnus is an ichnogenus of fossil footprints. Its toes were slender and the prints overall were about the size of tracks left by modern lizards. They have been preserved in the Supai Formation. These tracks have not been studied much since Gilmore's original research.
