= Vermejo Formation =

Geologic formation in Colorado and New Mexico

- Stratigraphic range: Maastrichtian
- Type: Formation
- Underlies: Raton Formation
- Overlies: Trinidad Sandstone
- Thickness: 375 ft (114 m)

Lithology
- Primary: Sandstone, shale
- Other: Coal

Location
- Coordinates: 36.89°N 105.00°W
- Region: New Mexico; Colorado
- Country: United States

Type section
- Named for: Vermejo Park
- Named by: W.T. Lee
- Year defined: 1913
- Vermejo Formation (the United States) Vermejo Formation (Colorado)

The Vermejo Formation is a geologic formation of Upper Cretaceous age. It outcrops in the Raton Basin of northeastern New Mexico and southern Colorado.

== Description ==
The formation consists of a light gray, soft, friable sandstone and shale, which is carbonaceous in part, and may have coal seams or thin coal beds. The Vermejo Formation is about 375 feet (116m) thick at the type locality which is Vermejo Park in Colfax County, New Mexico.

The Vermejo Formation unconformably overlies the Trinidad Sandstone, and unconformably underlies the Raton Formation.

The Rail Canyon sandstone member is a sandstone bed up to 50 feet (15 m) thick that is found 10–50 feet (3.0–15.2 m) above the base of the formation.

== Economic geology ==
The Vermejo Formation is an historically important coal-bearing formation. Mining began in 1870 in the rich Raton coal bed near the base of the Vermejo Formation. The bed contained bituminous coals of coking quality. These were being extensively exploited by 1924 but the beds were largely exhausted by 1965.

The formation has also been exploited for coalbed methane.

== History of investigation ==
The Vermejo Formation was originally named by W. T. Lee in 1913 in the American Journal of Science. In 1917, Lee described the formation more completely.

== See also ==
- Vermejo Reserve – Guest ranch in New Mexico, United States
