= Belden Shale =

Geologic formation in Colorado, United States

- Stratigraphic range: Carboniferous
- Type: Formation

Location
- Coordinates: 39° 54' 56 North, 106° 43' 33 West
- Region: Colorado
- Country: United States, Colorado near McCoy town

The Belden Shale is a geologic formation in Colorado near the town of McCoy. It preserves fossils dating back to the Carboniferous period.

== See also ==
- List of fossiliferous stratigraphic units in Colorado
- Paleontology in Colorado
