= Minturn Formation =

Geologic formation in Colorado, United States

- Stratigraphic range: Carboniferous
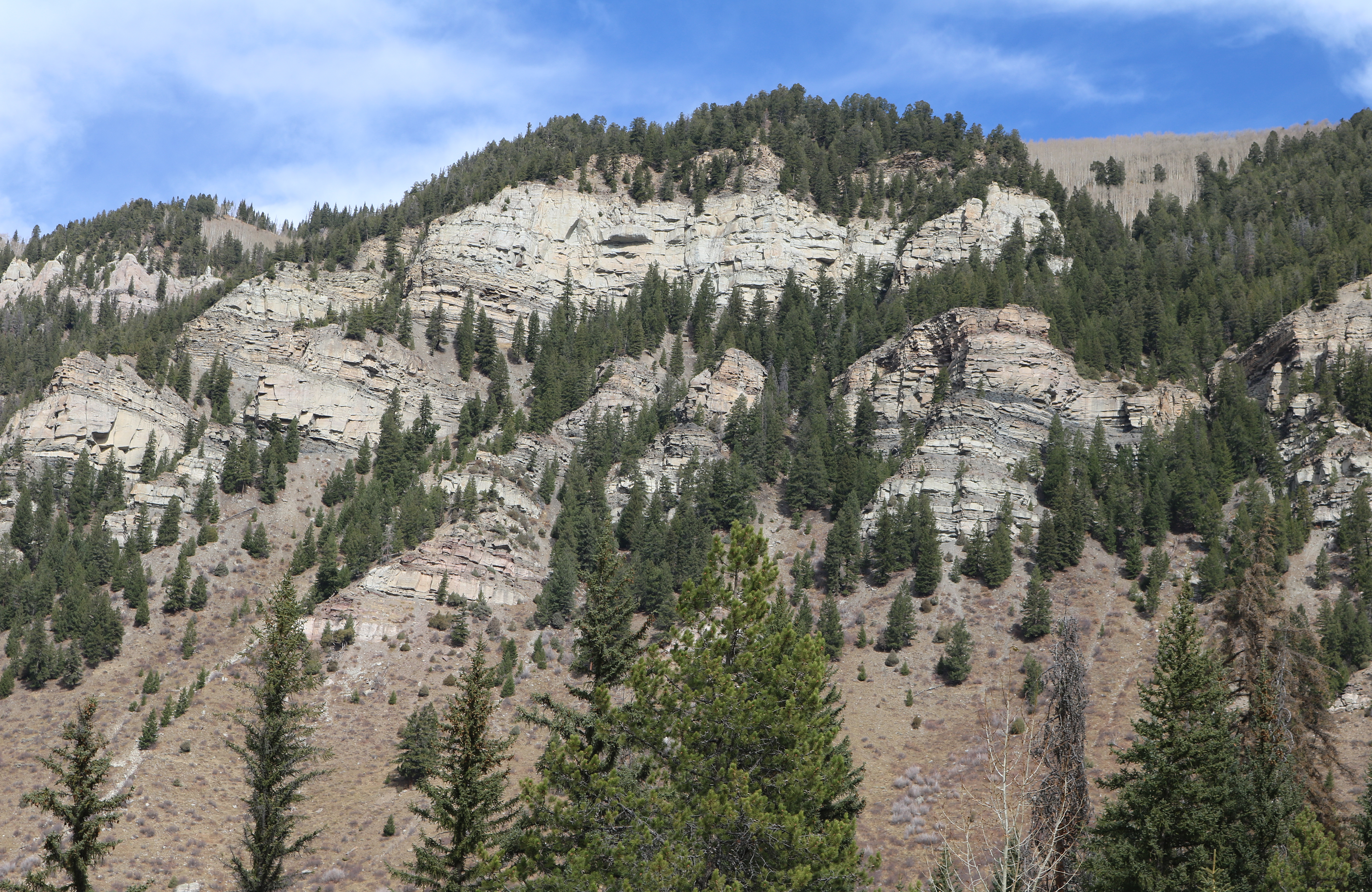
- The Minturn Formation above Minturn, Colorado
- Type: Formation
- Underlies: Fountain Formation

Location
- Region: Colorado
- Country: United States

The Minturn Formation is a geologic formation in Colorado. It preserves fossils dating back to the Carboniferous period. Among the fossils preserved are of crinoids, spiriferid brachiopods, gastropods, and the spines and teeth of numerous sharks such as Petalodus.

== See also ==
- List of fossiliferous stratigraphic units in Colorado
- Paleontology in Colorado
