= Paleontology in Colorado =

Paleontological research in the U.S. state of Colorado

The location of the state of Colorado

Paleontology in Colorado refers to paleontological research occurring within or conducted by people from the U.S. state of Colorado. The geologic column of Colorado spans about one third of Earth's history. Fossils can be found almost everywhere in the state but are not evenly distributed among all the ages of the state's rocks. During the early Paleozoic, Colorado was covered by a warm shallow sea that would come to be home to creatures like brachiopods, conodonts, ostracoderms, sharks and trilobites. This sea withdrew from the state between the Silurian and early Devonian leaving a gap in the local rock record. It returned during the Carboniferous. Areas of the state not submerged were richly vegetated and inhabited by amphibians that left behind footprints that would later fossilize. During the Permian, the sea withdrew and alluvial fans and sand dunes spread across the state. Many trace fossils are known from these deposits.

The sea returned during the Triassic, while exposed areas were a richly vegetated coastal plain that was home to dinosaurs. Colorado was again submerged by a sea during the Cretaceous period that was home to plesiosaurs up to 70 feet long. During the early part of the Cenozoic era, rainforests grew in Colorado. Later, another rich flora and fauna would come to be preserved in the Florissant beds, where both rhinoceroses and uintatheres lived. More recently the state's modern prairies began to form and the state was home to creatures like bison, camels, horses, and mammoths. Local Native Americans have devised myths to explain local fossil bones and dinosaur footprints. By the late 19th century, local fossils had attracted the attention of formally trained scientists. Major finds include the Late Jurassic dinosaurs of the Morrison Formation and the Cenozoic plants and mammals of the Florissant beds. The Jurassic plated dinosaur Stegosaurus armatus is the Colorado state fossil. Stegosaurus is also the state dinosaur of Colorado.

== Prehistory ==
No Precambrian fossils are known from Colorado, so the state's fossil record does not begin until the Paleozoic. At the start of the Paleozoic, Colorado was located near the equator. The state was submerged under a warm shallow sea. At least part of Colorado was covered by shallow water during the Middle Ordovician. At the time, Colorado was home to invertebrates like articulated brachiopods, conodonts, gastropods, ostracods, pelecypods, sponges, trilobites, and worms (known from trace fossils). Contemporary vertebrates included armored jawless fish called ostracoderms. Sometime between the Silurian and early Devonian the sea withdrew from the state. While the sea was gone local sediments were eroded away rather than deposited. During the Carboniferous the absent sea returned, although some areas of the state remained dry land. Brachiopods, crinoids, sharks, and trilobites inhabited the sea. A rich variety of plants grew in Colorado's terrestrial environments. Examples include Calamites, conifers, and lycopods. Mountain ranges were being raised in the western part of the state by geologic forces. During the Carboniferous, footprints were laid down in Colorado by early tetrapods that would later fossilize. That being said, Colorado is not generally a good source of Carboniferous aged fossils. Western Colorado had a series of alluvial fans during the Permian when the Cutler Group was being deposited. Preserved in these sediments are tracks referred to the ichnospecies Limnopus cutlerensis, which may have been left by a temnospodyl amphibian. During the Permian the sea withdrew once more from the state. In its place were fields of sand dunes. Tracks left by ancient insects and reptiles were preserved in these dune deposits. Also like the Carboniferous, despite the presence of contemporary trace fossils, the fossil record of Permian life in Colorado is relatively poor compared to states like Kansas and Texas.

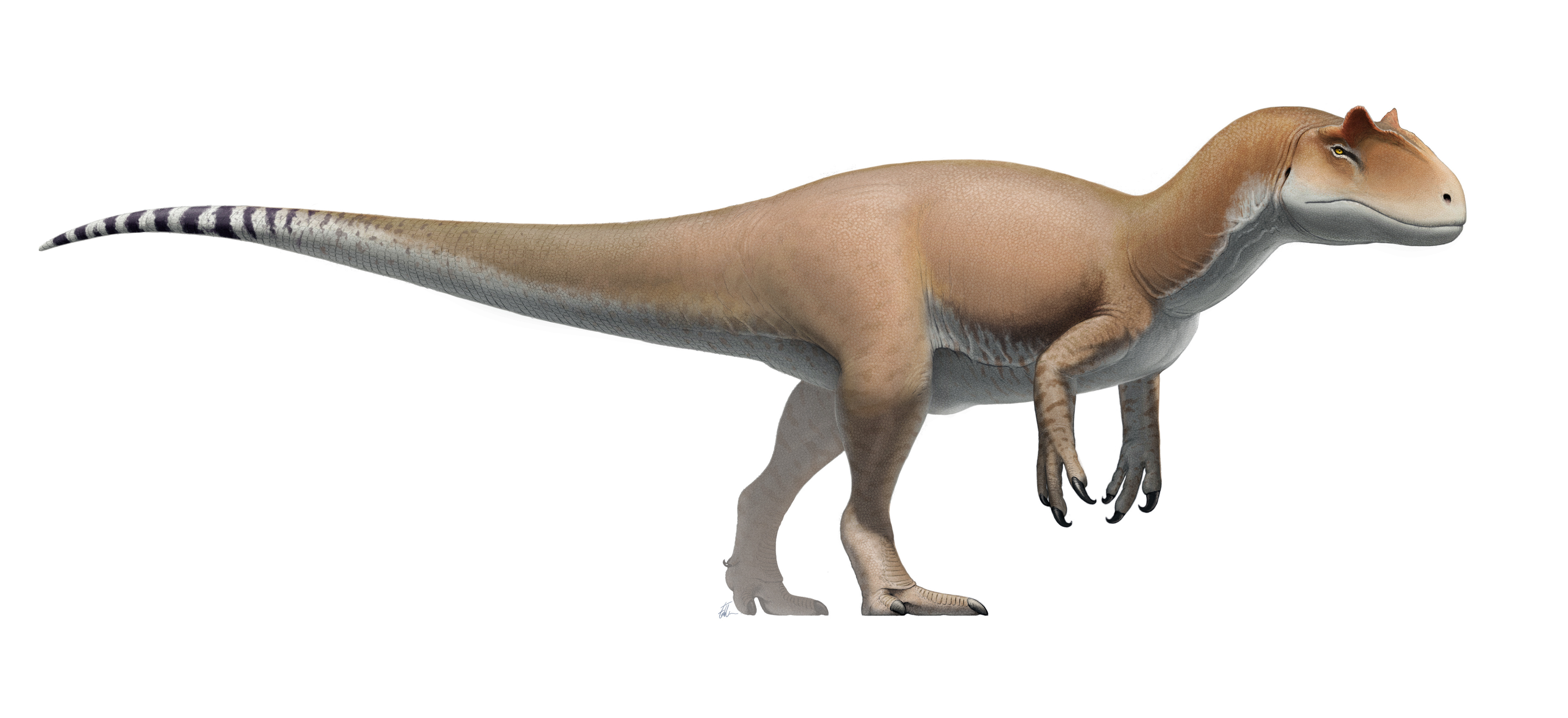
Allosaurus.

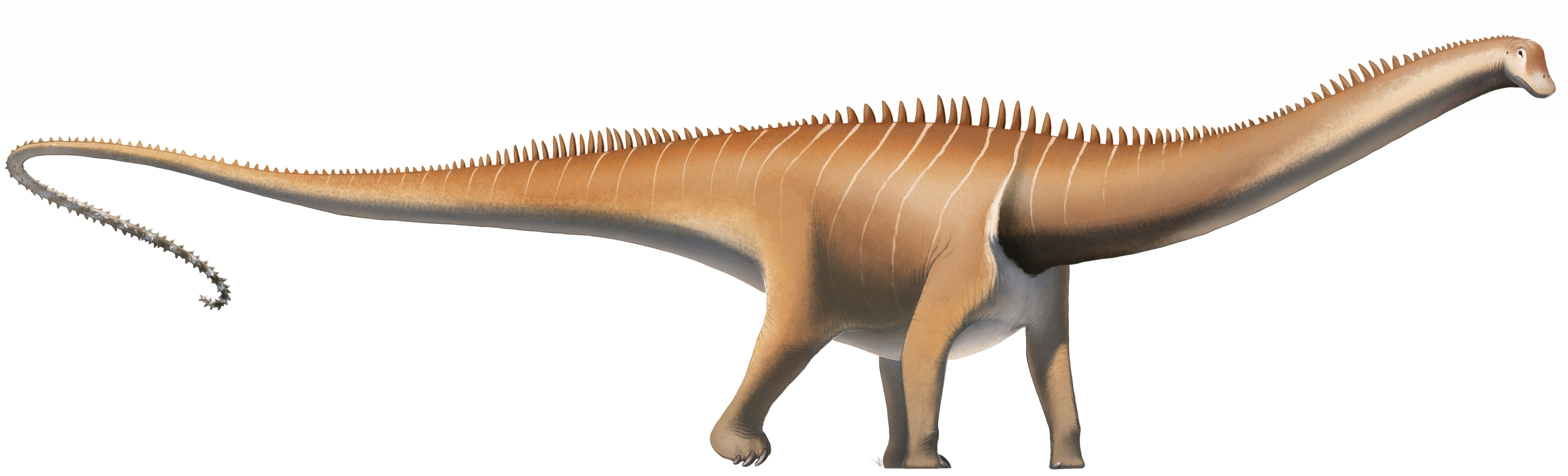
Diplodocus.

Seawater returned to Colorado during the ensuing Triassic period, although it left significant areas of the state uncovered. These terrestrial areas included coastal floodplains vegetated by conifers and inhabited by creatures like amphibians and dinosaurs. The Late Triassic also saw the formation of many footprints that would later fossilize. These are preserved in the sediments of the Chinle Formation of the northwestern part of the state. A chicken to turkey sized theropod dinosaur left behind footprints of the ichnogenus Agialopous. These tracks contain large number of the ichnogenus Rhynchosauroides, which resembles lizard footprints. The Chinle of Colorado also bears the greatest known abundance of the ichnogenus Gwynnedichnium. Both Triassic amphibians and reptiles left behind footprints near what is now the Fall Creek Post Office.

During the Late Jurassic deposition of the sediments now known as the Morrison Formation, both sauropods and theropods left behind footprints. Only two large tracksites of fossil footprints are known from the Morrison Formation and both of them are located in Colorado. A tracksite called Rancho del Rio preserves both sauropod and theropod tracks. The Rancho del Rio site is located along the Colorado River in central Colorado. The other large tracksite is the Purgatoire Valley tracksite of the eponymous Purgatoire River in southeastern Colorado. The Purgatoire Valley tracksite is 400 meters at its widest and contains four track-bearing strata. One of the four track bearing strata bears more than 1,300 individual prints. A series of five parallel trackways left by young sauropods provides important evidence for dinosaur social behavior. The trackways of young sauropods found at the Purgatoire Valley site fill important gaps in the local body fossil record, as the vast majority of sauropods skeletal remains in the Morrison come from grown individuals.

Much of Colorado was covered by an expanding sea during the ensuing Cretaceous period. This sea is known as the Western Interior Seaway. Algae, fish, molluscs, and marine reptiles inhabited its waters. The mosasaur Platecarpus was one such marine reptile. When the Graneros Shale was being deposited in Colorado, the plesiosaur Thalassomedon lived in the state. This was a truly huge plesiosaur that could exceed 45 feet in length. Beyond the shores of this sea were forests and swamps where early flowering plants grew. Later in the Cretaceous, the sea withdrew. Dinosaurs were still present, but the vegetation had undergone significant changes. The forests were now made of broadleafed trees and palms. At this point the local Rocky Mountains began to rise. During the Cretaceous cephalopods with coiled shells and clams were preserved at Monument Creek. Fish were present in Coloradan waters and left behind scales that would later fossilize. On land the flora also left behind leaves that would later fossilize. The sediments of the Benton Formation preserved both invertebrates and marine reptiles. The bivalve Ostrea congesta was preserved in the Colorado Niobrara Formation. The Niobrara's vertebrate life included sharks, which left behind fossil teeth. Colorado was home to bivalves and straight shelled cephalopods when the Pierre shale was being deposited. The Pierre shale are mound-shaped bioherms up to 15 inches in diameter. A sixty to seventy foot plesiosaur was preserved in what is now Baca County, which is in the southeastern region of the state. Marine mollusks were preserved in the Fox Hills Formation. Oysters and other mollusks were preserved in the sediments now composing the Dakota Formation. Aspects of the Coloradan flora were also preserved from this time. The most common plant fossils of the Dakota are the leaves of deciduous trees. Other contemporary plants included ferns and palms.

The uplift of the Rocky Mountains persisted into the early part of the Cenozoic era. They were surrounded by rainforests at this point in prehistory. Areas in the state with lower elevation became the sites of vast lakes. Fish, insects, and leaves would end up entombed in sediments deposited by these lakes. After the start of the Cenozoic, early Paleocene turtles left behind fossils near modern Golden. The Coloradan flora of the ensuing Eocene epoch left behind plant fossils like ferns, palm leaves, and petrified wood. Animal life of northwestern Colorado during the Eocene included the primitive horse Eohippus, early titanotheres, and uintatheres. A rich flora grew in Colorado during the Oligocene. At least 150 different kinds of plants from this epoch are preserved in what is now the Florissant beds of Colorado. Among the members of this flora were sequoia trees with trunks up to 17 1/2 feet in diameter. More than a thousand different kinds of insect have been documented among the same beds. Beetles were among the Florissant insects. A diverse mammalian fauna inhabited this ancient forest. Members included animals resembling giant pigs, rhinoceroses, and titanotheres. During the Pliocene, Colorado was home to creatures like rhinoceroses and giant pig-like animals. The state's modern prairies formed during the Quaternary. Colorado was shaken by volcanic eruptions. The state's climate gradually cooled as the Cenozoic proceeded. The rainforests gave way to sequoia forests and grasslands. Pleistocene Colorado had a diverse mammal fauna. Among them were Archidiskodon, a relative of modern elephants. Bison, camels, horses, and mammoths also inhabited the state at this time.

== History ==
=== Indigenous interpretations ===
Not far from Grand Junction is a tall cottonwood tree called the Ute Council Tree. Close by is an obvious dinosaur track site. The Ute had a myth regarding these tracks that justified the tree as a significant meeting place, although the contents of the tale are now lost. Oglala Lakota historian Johnson Holy Rock has described an old story about a Lakota hunting party traveling through northeastern Colorado who were caught during an exceptionally violent thunderstorm while camping. They thought the violence of the storm was due to the Thunder Birds being angry and trying to kill something with their lightning. When morning came, the Lakota hunters went down onto the plain where the storm was most intense. There they found the carcass of an animal with an unusual long nose who was "so strange that they wondered how it managed to eat." This story may be based on the region's abundant fossils. Candidates for the unusual remains found after the storm include brontotheres, entelodonts, or proboscidean remains. Johnson Holy Rock, who told the story, was inclined to think of the animal as a proboscidean or giant tapir.

=== Scientific research ===
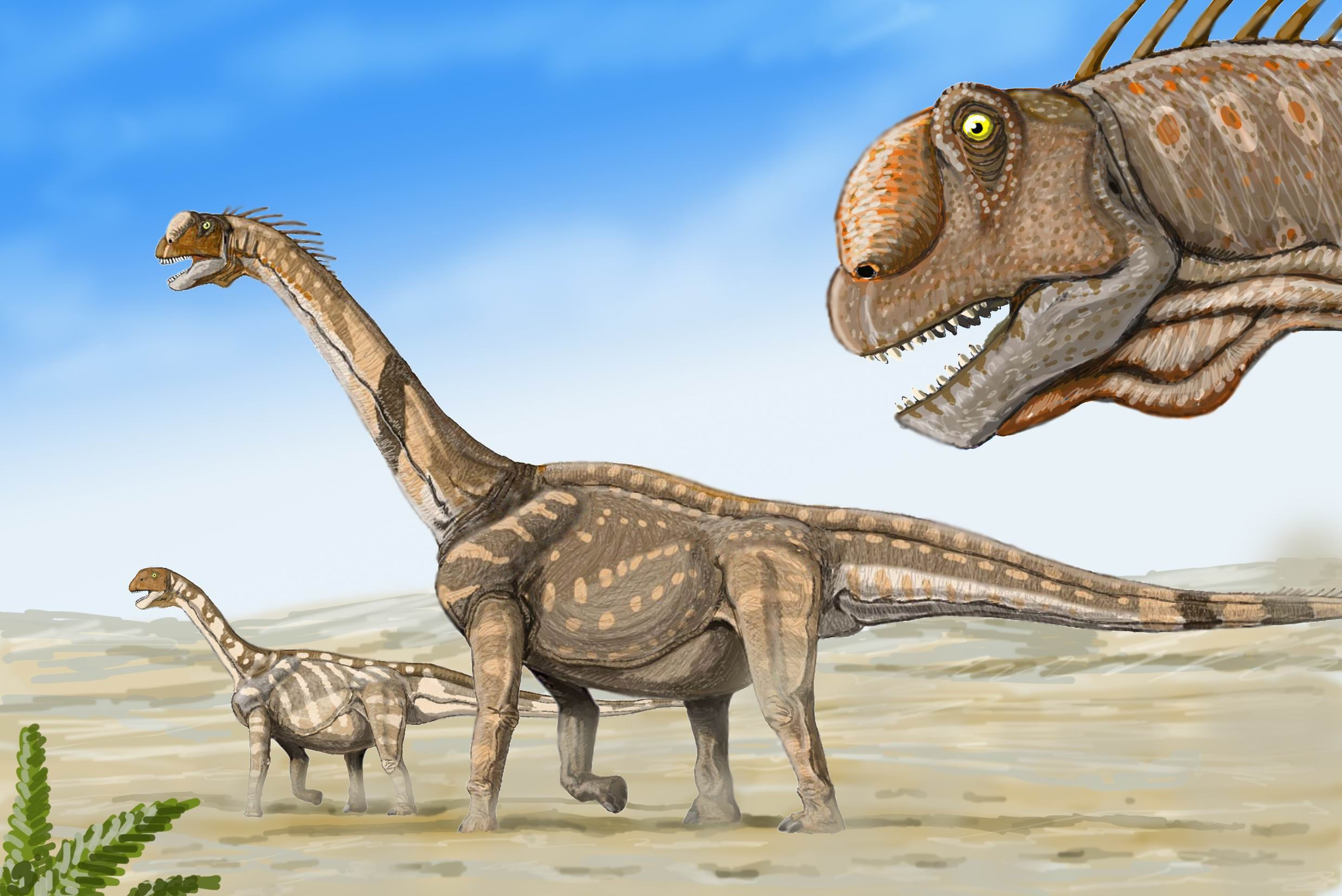
Camarasaurus supremus.

Around March 1877 a man named Oramel Lucas discovered sauropod bones in a valley called Garden Park located a few miles north of Canon City. He wrote to Edward Drinker Cope and O. C. Marsh, the famous rival paleontologists of the Bone Wars to alert them about his discovery. Although Marsh never responded, Cope did, and Oramel Lucas and his brother Ira began digging up local fossils and sending them to Cope. These turned out to be the remains of a new species. By August of the same year, Cope had formally named the animal excavated by the Lucas brothers Camarasaurus supremus. This species may have been the most massive known in the entire Morrison Formation, with estimated putting its body weight at more than 100,000 lbs. Later, a crew working on behalf of O. C. Marsh under Mudge and Williston started a quarry nearby. They made several important finds like the new species Allosaurus fragilis and Diplodocus longus. Following the initial excavations in the quarry field work stopped until 1883. That year brothers Marshall and Henry Felch reopened excavations there, again on behalf of O. C. Marsh. They worked for five year collecting many dinosaurs already known from the formation, but also the new species Ceratosaurus nasicornis.

In 1890 paleontologist Charles D. Walcott found broken pieces of the bony plates embedded in the skin of Middle Ordovician jawless fish known as ostracoderms. These fossils were the oldest known vertebrate remains in the world at the time. The rocks preserving the fossils were gray and reddish sandstone deposited by shallow water. Other fossils found alongside the ostracoderms lived articulated brachiopods, conodonts, gastropods, ostracods, pelecypods, sponges, trilobites, and trace fossils left by worms.

After the Felch brothers ended their field work, the so-called Marsh-Felch quarry lay unworked for twelve years. However, in 1900 William Utterback began fieldwork in the area under John Bell Hatcher for the Carnegie Museum of Natural History. In the two ensuing years of field work Utterback found many skeletons of previously known dinosaurs, but also the new genus Haplocanthosaurus. This was the smallest known sauropod species of the Morrison Formation. Around 1920 major fossil finds occurred in Oligocene deposits Colorado shares with South Dakota. Dozens of articulated skeletons and skulls were uncovered. Among them were animals resembling giant peccaries and rhinoceroses, as well as entelodonts and brontotheriids. One notable rhinoceros discovery had occurred in Weld County. In 1925 small duckbilled dinosaurs were discovered in eastern Colorado. Later, in 1955, the American Museum of Natural History uncovered a stone block in south-central Colorado preserving several Eocene Eohippus skeletons.

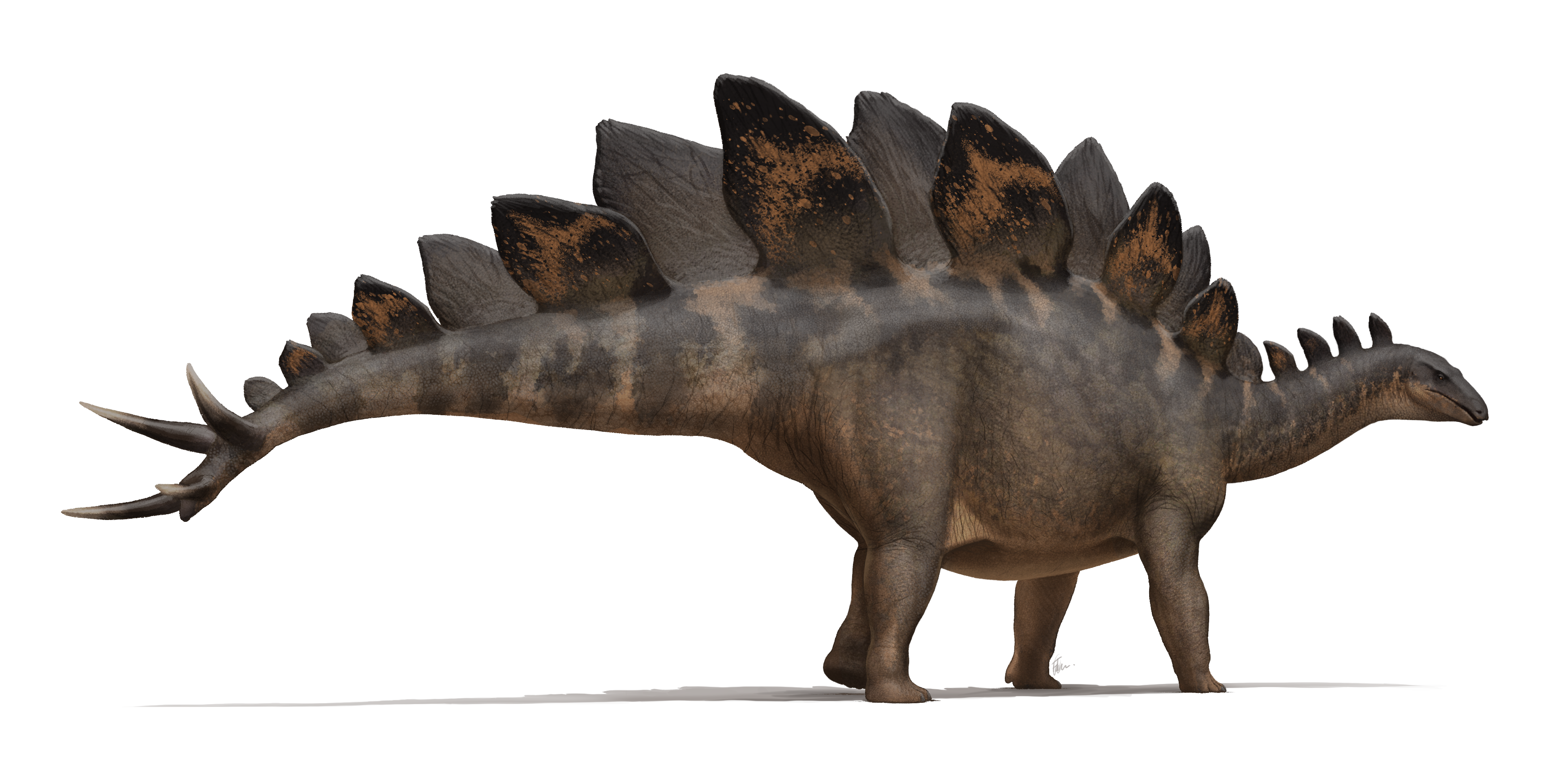
Stegosaurus.

In 1960 Malcolm McKenna discovered two early Paleocene turtles on behalf of the American Museum of Natural History on South Table Mountain. The following year, curator of the University of Colorado Museum at Boulder discovered even more turtles of that age at the same place. In the summer of 1961 a major discovery happened south of Denver in Douglas County, at a site known as Lamb Spring. Charles Lamb, the owner of a tract of land used for cattle grazing, was dredging out the bottom of a watering hole for the cattle. A great abundance of bones were discovered under the thin layer of mud at the bottom of the watering hole. The owners alerted paleontologists at Denver about the find. The researchers at Denver passed on word of the find to the Smithsonian Institution of Washington D.C. In response, the National Science Foundation funded an expedition coordinated by the Smithsonian Institution to the wateringhole. The lowest bones in the deposit were left by Columbian mammoths. Higher in the deposit the excavators uncovered bison, camels, and horses. By the end of the summer, 13 gigantic cases containing a total of 341 fossil bones were shipped to the National Museum in Washington D.C. The site is now managed and protected as Lamb Spring Archaeological Preserve. In the spring of 1963, road work in Limon County near the town of Limon uncovered a mammoth tooth and tusk.

In 1965, the Florissant fossil beds were proposed as a potential federal preserve. Peter Robinson studied the Miocene fossil vertebrates of Middle Park during the mid-1960s. These fossils were discovered a short distance northwest of Denver. By 1964 he had discovered the skull of a relatively large camel. Another notable discovery during his research program was the seventh known microfauna site in the park. More recently, in 1982, the Jurassic plated dinosaur Stegosaurus armatus was designated the Colorado state fossil. Stegosaurus was also designated the Colorado state dinosaur that same year.

== Protected areas ==
- Florissant Fossil Beds National Monument

== Paleontologists ==
=== Births ===
Elaine Anderson was born in Salida on January 8, 1936. Anderson would come to be known primarily for her book, The Pleistocene Mammals of North America and her research on Ice Age carnivores.

Myra Keen was born in Colorado Springs in 1905. She would go on to become one of the world's foremost paleomalacologists.

=== Deaths ===
Elaine Anderson died in Denver on March 26, 2002 at age 66.

Malcolm McKenna died in Boulder on March 3, 2008. McKenna was best known for publishing a comprehensive classification of mammals.

Charles Repenning died in Lakewood on January 5, 2005. Repenning is known for research into fossil desmostylians and shrews.

== Natural history museums ==
- Denver Museum of Nature and Science, Denver.
- Morrison Natural History Museum, Morrison
- Museum of Western Colorado's Dinosaur Journey Museum, Fruita
- Northwest Colorado Field Museum at Colorado Northwestern Community College, Craig
- Royal Gorge Regional Museum & History Center, Cañon City
- University of Colorado Museum of Natural History, Boulder

== Notable clubs and associations ==
- Western Interior Paleontological Society
- Denver Gem & Mineral Show

== See also ==
- Paleontology in Arizona
- Paleontology in Kansas
- Paleontology in Nebraska
- Paleontology in New Mexico
- Paleontology in Oklahoma
- Paleontology in Utah
- Paleontology in Wyoming
