= List of fossiliferous stratigraphic units in Utah =

This article contains a list of fossil-bearing stratigraphic units in the state of Utah, U.S.

== Sites ==
Group or Formation	Period	Notes
Arcturus Formation	Permian	
Blackhawk Formation	Cretaceous	
Brazer Dolomite	Carboniferous	
Brian Head Formation	Paleogene	
Burro Canyon Formation	Cretaceous	
Carmel Formation	Jurassic	
Castle Gate Formation	Cretaceous	
Castlegate Formation	Cretaceous	
Cedar Mountain Formation	Cretaceous	
Chainman Formation	Carboniferous	
Chainman Shale	Carboniferous	
Chinle Formation	Triassic	
Chinle Group/Rock Point Formation	Triassic	
Chisholm Formation	Cambrian	
Colton Formation	Paleogene	
Crystal Peak Dolomite Formation	Ordovician	
Cutler Formation	Permian	
Dakota Formation	Cretaceous	
Dakota Sandstone	Cretaceous	
Dakota Group/Cedar Mountain Formation	Cretaceous, Jurassic	
Deseret Formation	Carboniferous	
Deseret Limestone	Carboniferous	
Deseret Limestone	Carboniferous	
Dinwoody Formation	Triassic	
Duchesne River Formation	Paleogene	
Dunderberg Shale	Cambrian	
Elephant Canyon Formation	Permian, Carboniferous	
Ely Formation	Carboniferous	
Ely Limestone	Carboniferous	
Ely Springs Dolomite Formation	Ordovician	
Engelmann Formation	Devonian	
Entrada Formation	Jurassic	
Evacuation Creek Formation	Paleogene	
Ferron Formation	Cretaceous	
Fillmore Formation	Ordovician	
Fillmore Limestone	Ordovician	
Fish Haven Dolomite Formation	Ordovician	
Fitchville Formation	Carboniferous	
Flagstaff Formation	Paleogene	
Fort Union Formation	Paleogene	
Frontier Formation	Cretaceous	
Garden City Formation	Ordovician	
Glen Canyon Group/Kayenta Formation	Jurassic	
Glen Canyon Group/Moenave Formation	Jurassic, Triassic	
Glen Canyon Group/Navajo Sandstone	Jurassic	
Glen Canyon Group/Navajo Sandstone Group/Nugget Formation	Jurassic	
Glen Canyon Group/Wingate Formation	Triassic	
Glen Canyon Group/Wingate Sandstone	Triassic	
Great Blue Limestone	Carboniferous	
Green River Formation	Paleogene	
Henefer Formation	Cretaceous	
Hermosa Formation	Carboniferous	
Honaker Trail Formation	Carboniferous	
House Limestone	Ordovician	
Humbug Formation	Carboniferous	
Illipah Formation	Carboniferous	
Iron Springs Formation	Cretaceous	
Juab Formation	Ordovician	
Juab Limestone	Ordovician	
Kaibab Limestone	Permian	
Kaiparowits Formation	Cretaceous	
Kanosh Formation	Ordovician	
Kanosh Shale	Ordovician	
Kayenta Formation	Jurassic	
Kelvin Formation	Cretaceous	
Laketown Dolomite Formation	Silurian, Ordovician	
Lance Formation	Cretaceous	
Langston Formation	Cambrian	
Laramie Formation	Cretaceous	
Lead Bell Shale	Cambrian	
Lehman Formation	Ordovician	
Lodgepole Limestone	Carboniferous	
Lone Mountain Formation	Silurian	
Lower Wheeler Shale	Cambrian	
Madison Formation	Carboniferous	
Mancos Shale	Cretaceous	
Mancos Group/Frontier Formation	Cretaceous	
Manning Canyon Formation	Carboniferous	
Manning Canyon Shale	Carboniferous	
Marjum Formation	Cambrian	
Marjum Limestone	Cambrian	
Mesa Verde Formation	Cretaceous	
Mesaverde Formation	Cretaceous	
Mesaverde Group/Castlegate Formation	Cretaceous	
Mesaverde Group/Nelsen Formation	Cretaceous	
Moenkopi Formation	Triassic	
Moroni Formation	Neogene	
Morrison Formation	Jurassic	
Nelsen Formation	Cretaceous	
Nopah Formation	Cambrian	
North Horn Formation	Paleogene, Cretaceous	
Norwood Tuff Formation	Paleogene	
Notch Peak Formation	Cambrian	
Opohonga Formation	Ordovician	
Oquirrh Formation	Carboniferous	
Oquirrh Group/Bingham Mine Formation	Carboniferous	
Oquirrh Group/Butterfield Formation	Carboniferous	
Oquirrh Group/Oquirrh Formation	Carboniferous	
Orr Formation	Cambrian	
Park City Formation	Permian	
Park City Group/Gerster Formation	Permian	
Park City Group/Plympton Formation	Permian	
Phosphoria Formation	Permian	
Pioche Formation	Cambrian	
Pogonip Group/Fillmore Formation	Ordovician	
Pogonip Group/Wah Wah Formation	Ordovician	
Pogonip Group/Wahwah Formation	Ordovician	
Price River Formation	Cretaceous	
Round Valley Formation	Carboniferous	
Salt Lake Formation	Neogene	
San Rafael Group/Carmel Formation	Jurassic	
San Rafael Group/Curtis Formation	Jurassic	
San Rafael Group/Entrada Sandstone	Jurassic	
San Rafael Group/Page Sandstone	Jurassic	
Sappington Formation	Carboniferous	
Sevier Formation	Neogene	
Sinbad Formation	Triassic	
Soapstone Formation	Carboniferous	
St. Charles Formation	Ordovician	
Straight Cliffs Formation	Cretaceous	
Stump Formation	Jurassic	
Summerville Formation	Jurassic	
Swan Peak Formation	Ordovician	
Swasey Limestone	Cambrian	
Thaynes Formation	Triassic	
Thaynes Formation	Triassic	
Thaynes Formation	Triassic	
Thaynes Formation	Triassic	
Toroweap Formation	Permian	
Tropic Shale	Cretaceous	
Uintah Formation	Paleogene	
Upper Weeks Limestone	Cambrian	
Upper Wheeler Shale	Cambrian	
Ute Limestone	Cambrian	
Virgin Formation	Triassic	
Wahwah Formation	Ordovician	
Wahwah Limestone	Ordovician	
Wahweap Formation	Cretaceous	
Wasatch Formation	Paleogene	
Watson Ranch Quartzite Formation	Ordovician	
Weeks Formation	Cambrian	
Wheeler Shale	Cambrian	
White Pine Shale	Carboniferous	

== See also ==
- Paleontology in Utah
