= Wahwah Limestone =

Geologic formation in Utah, United States

- Stratigraphic range: Early – Middle Ordovician; ~477.1–462 Ma
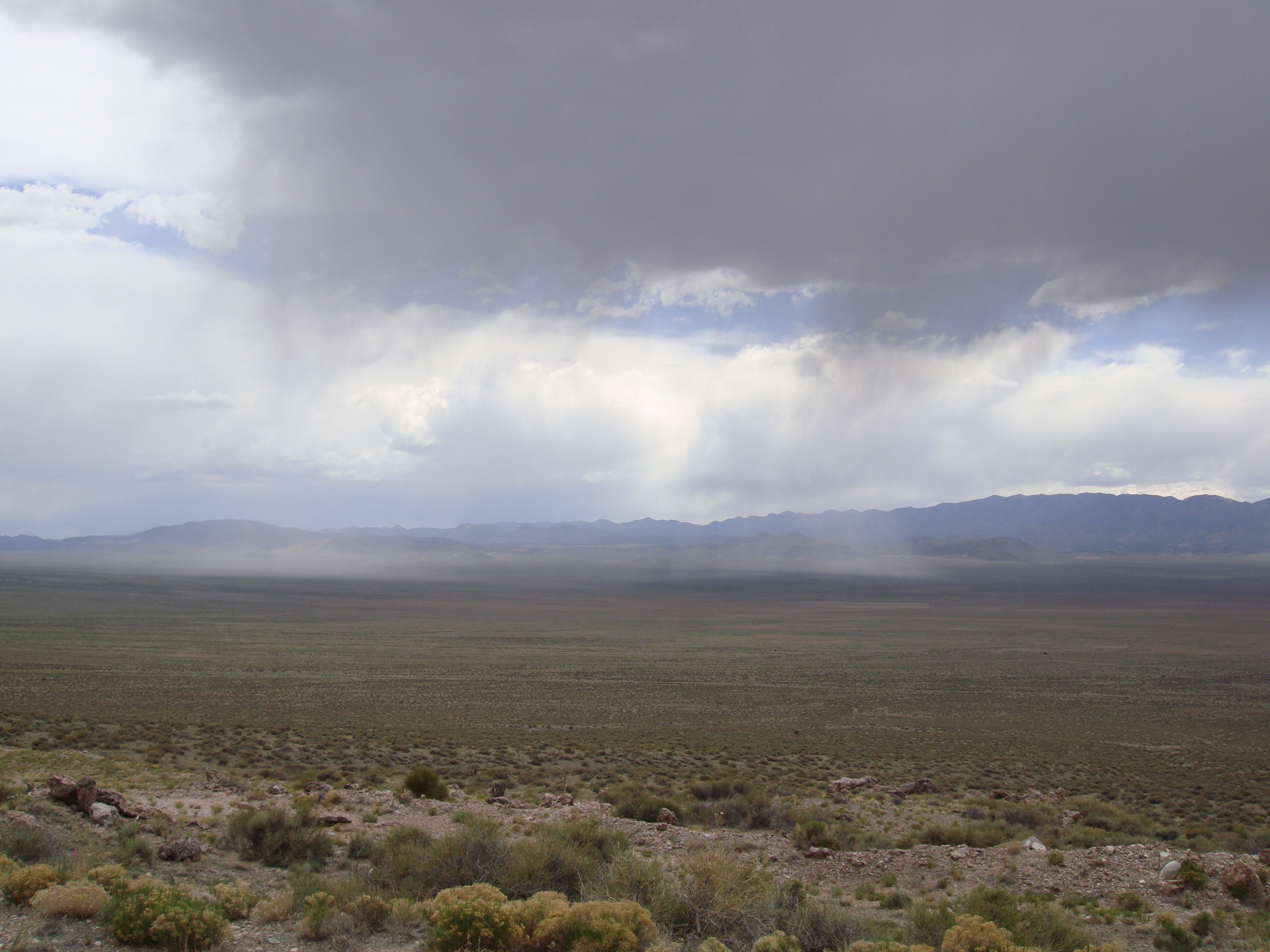
- Wah Wah Valley in 2016, the locality after which the formation is named.
- Type: Formation
- Unit of: Pogonip Group
- Underlies: Juab Limestone
- Overlies: Fillmore Limestone
- Thickness: 78.6 m (258 ft)

Lithology
- Primary: Limestone
- Other: Dolomite, Conglomerate, Shale

Location
- Region: Utah
- Country: United States

Type section
- Named for: Wah Wah Valley
- Named by: Hintze
- Location: Section J
- Year defined: 1951

The Wahwah Limestone, sometimes referred to as the Wahwah Formation or spelt "Wah Wah", is a limestone geologic formation in Utah. It preserves fossils dating back to the Early to Middle Ordovician period.

== Discovery and naming ==
In 1951, Lehi Hintze would publish a report on the stratigraphy of Early Ordovician rocks in Utah, in which he described and named the "Wahwah Limestone", taking its name from the Wah Wah Valley from which it can be found within.

== Geology ==
The Wahwah Limestone can be found outcropping in the US state of Utah, within the Ibex, Confusion, and Thomas Ranges, where it is overlain by the massive limestones of the Juab Limestone, whilst it is underlain by the Fillmore Limestone. The formation itself, as the name suggests, is predominately composed of limestones and dolomites, with occasional beds of pebble conglomerate and shale throughout.

== Biostratigraphy ==
Using fossils found within the formation, the upper layers of the Wahwah Limestone was dated to the "Whiterockian", now the Dapingian, inferred from the occurrence of the species Psephosthenaspis microspinosa appearing above what is referred to as the "K" Bed in the uppermost sections of the Wahwah Limestone. Alongside this, fauna from the Paralenorthis-Orthidiella and Tripodus laevis Zones has also been found within the upper layers, giving further credence to an early Middle Ordovician date for the upper Wahwah Limestone. More recent studies have seen the lower sections of the Wahwah Limestone dated to the late Ibexian, now the late Floian, of the Early Ordovician, inferred from the presence of fossils known from the Pseudocybele nasuta, Hesperonomiella minor, and Reutterodus andinus Zones.

The graptolite "Zone 5" can also be found entirely within the Wahwah Limestone, which Tetragraptus is the main constituent of, ranging from the Early to Middle Ordovician.

== Palaeoenvironment ==
The environment at the time of the Wahwah Limestone's deposition was in a shallow-subtidal marine setting which was storm-dominated, on a mixed-carbonate and clastic passive shelf, inferred from storm-generated grainstones within a sub-tidal wackestone facies. The climate was that of a warm tropical climate.

== Paleobiota ==
The Wahwah Limestone contains a notably large collection of Early Ordovician fossils from what is known as "Section J" as well as layers of "Section H" and "Section Sc", from trilobites such as Carolinites and Psephosthenaspis, to molluscs, such as the cephalopods Tajaroceras and Endoceras, and echinoderms like the probable solute Drepanocystis.

Color key: Taxon / Reclassified taxon / Taxon falsely reported as present / Dubious taxon or junior synonym / Ichnotaxon / Ootaxon / Morphotaxon

Notes
Uncertain or tentative taxa are in small text
~~crossed out~~ taxa are discredited.

=== Arthropoda ===
Arthropoda
Genus	Species	Notes	Images
Barrandia (?)	Barrandia (?)	Nileid trilobite.	
Bethamaspis	B. diminutiva	Bathyurid trilobite.	
Carolinites	C. cf. C. ekphymosus; C. genacinaca	Telephinid trilobites. C. genacinaca is notably the most widespread trilobite species.	
Cybelospis	C. cf. C. speciosa	Pliomerid trilobite.	
Dimeropygiella	D. caudanodosa	Dimeropygid trilobite.	
Diacanthaspis	Diacanthaspis sp. indet.	Odontopleurid trilobite.	
Eleutherocentrus	Eleutherocentrus sp.	Bathyurid trilobite.	
Ectenonotus	E. progenitor; E. cf. E. whittingtoni	Pliomerid trilobite.	
Goniotelus	Goniotelus sp.	Trilobite.	
Goniotelina	G. williamsi; G. brighti; G. brevus; G. ensifer; G. wahwahensis	Proetid trilobites.	
Ischyrotoma	I. stubblefieldi; I. caudanodosa; I. wahwahensis	Proetid trilobite.	
Isoteloides	I. polaris	Asaphid trilobite.	
Kanoshia	K. cf. K. insoltia	Pliomerid trilobite.	
Kawina	K. sexapugia; K. webbi	Cheirurid trilobites.	
Kirkella	K. declivita	Trilobite.	
Lachnostoma	L. latucelsum	Asaphid trilobite.	
Madaraspis	M. magnifica	Bathyurid trilobite.	
Pliomerops	P. cf. P. insolita	Pliomerid trilobite.	
Presbynileus	P. utahensis	Asaphid trilobite.	
Pseudocybele	P. nasuta	Pliomerid trilobite. Namesake of the Pseudocybele nasuta Zone, dating the lower layers of the formation to the Floian.	
Psephosthenaspis	P. microspinosa; P. pseudobathyurus	Bathyurid trilobites. Described from this formation and namesake of the Psephosthenaspis Zone, dating the upper layers of the formation to the "Whiterockian".	
Pseudomera	P. arachnopyge	Pliomerid trilobite.	
Punka	P. cf. P. nitida	Bathyurid trilobite.	
Ptyocephalus	P. declivita; P. cf. P. vigilans	Asaphid trilobites.	
Stenorhachis	S. genalticurvatus	Asaphid trilobite.	
Trigonocerca (?)	Trigonocerca (?) sp.	Asaphid trilobite.	
Trigonocercella	T. acuta	Asaphid trilobite.	
Uromystrum	Uromystrum sp.	Bathyurid trilobite.	

=== Conodont ===
Conodont
Genus	Species	Notes	Images
Reutterodus (?)	R. (?) andinus	Prioniodontid conodont. Namesake of the Reutterodus andinus Zone, dating the lower layers of the formation to the Floian.	
Jumudontus	J. gananda	Oistodontid conodont.	
Juanognathus	J. variabilis	Oistodontid conodont.	
Oepikodus	O. communis	Oepikodontid conodont.	
Fahraeusodus	F. marathonensis	Periodontid conodont.	
Tripodus	T. laevis	Acodontid conodont. Namesake of the Tripodus laevis Zone, dating the upper layers of the formation to the "Whiterockian".	
Protoprioniodus	P. aranda	Paracordylodontid conodont.	

=== Lophotrochozoa ===
Lophotrochozoa
Genus	Species	Notes	Images
Campbelloceras	Campbelloceras sp.	Tarphyceratid cephalopod.	
Catoraphiceras	Catoraphiceras sp.	Protocycloceratid cephalopod.	
Endoceras	Endoceras sp.	Endoceratid cephalopod.	
Tajaroceras	T. wardae	Troedssonellid cephalopod. Described from this formation.	
Lesuerilla (?)	Lesuerilla (?) sp.	Gastropod.	
Raphistomina	Raphistomina sp.	Holopeid gastropod.	
Loxoplocus	Loxoplocus sp.	Lophospirid gastropod.	
Diparelasma	D. cf. D. transversa	Brachiopod.	
Hesperonomia	H. fontinalis; H. cf. H. dinorthoides	Hesperonomiid brachiopods.	
Hesperonomiella	H. minor	Brachiopod. Namesake of the Hesperonomiella minor Zone, dating the lower layers of the formation to the Floian.	
Syntrophopsis	S. transversa; S. cf. S. polita	Brachiopod.	
Tritoechia	T. sinuata	Brachiopod.	
Paralenorthis	P. marshalli	Orthoid brachiopod. Part namesake of the Paralenorthis-Orthidiella Zone, dating the upper layers of the formation to the "Whiterockian".	
Anomalorthis	A. juabensis; A. lambda	Orthoid brachiopods.	
Orthidiella	Orthidiella sp.	Orthoid brachiopods. Part namesake of the Paralenorthis-Orthidiella Zone, dating the upper layers of the formation to the "Whiterockian".	

=== Echinodermata ===
Echinodermata
Genus	Species	Notes	Images
Eukrinaster	E. ibexensis	Eukrinasterid starfish. Described from this formation.	
Drepanocystis	D. dubius	A probable solute. Described from this formation.	
Anatifopsis	A. fillmorensis	Mitrate echinoderm.	
Haimacystis	H. rozhnovi	blastozoan echinoderm. Described from this formation.	

=== Graptolithina ===
Graptolithina
Genus	Species	Notes	Images
Tetragraptus	T. pogonipensis; T. ibexensis; T. bigsbyi; T. ogilis	Phyllograptid graptolite. The constituent fossil of the graptolite "Zone 5" in Utah.	
Desmograptus	Desmograptus spp.	Callograptid graptolite.	
Dichograptus	D. octobrachiatus	Dichograptid graptolite.	
Didymograptus	D. extensus	Didymograptid graptolite.	
Phyllograptus	P. loringi; P. ilicifolius major; P. griggsi; P. anna; P. anna longus	Phyllograptid graptolite.	

=== Porifera ===
Porifera
Genus	Species	Notes	Images
Zittelella	Z. cf. Z. clarae	Anthaspidellid sponge.	
Calathium	Calathium sp.	A probable sponge.	

=== Incertae sedis ===
Incertae sedis
Genus	Species	Notes	Images
Ptiloncodus	Ptiloncodus sp.	Hooked shaped microfossils of unknown affinities.	

=== Undescribed ===
Undescribed
Genus	Species	Notes	Images
Nileus-like fossils	???	Trilobite fossil, with similarities to Nileus.	
Illaenus-like fossils	???	Trilobite fossil, with similarities to Illaenus.	
Bellerophon-like fossils	???	Gastropod fossil, with similarities to Bellerophon.	
Frodospira-like fossils	???	Gastropod fossil, with similarities to Frodospira. Previously reported as Lophospira-like fossils.	
Lytospira-like fossils	???	Gastropod fossil, with similarities to Lytospira.	
Minervaecystid indet.	???	An indeterminate solutan, with similarities to the minervaecystids.	
Bryozoa fossils	???	Bryozoa fossils.	

== See also ==
- List of fossiliferous stratigraphic units in Utah
- Paleontology in Utah
