= Humbug Formation =

Geologic formation in Utah, United States

- Stratigraphic range: Mississippian (Meramecian); 345–336 Ma
- Type: Formation
- Thickness: More than 2,100 feet (640 m) (Stansbury Island)

Lithology
- Primary: Dolomite

Location
- Coordinates: 40.2°N 111.7°W
- Approximate paleocoordinates: 3.1°S 46.9°W
- Region: Utah
- Country: United States
- Humbug Formation (the United States) Humbug Formation (Utah)

The Humbug Formation is a geologic formation in Utah. It preserves fossils dating back to the Mississippian (Meramecian) of the Carboniferous period.

== Description ==
The Humbug Formation includes intercalated limestones, orthoquartzitic sandstones, and dolomite. It is more than 2,100 feet (640 m) thick on Stansbury Island but thins to the east and south. There the formation averages about 600 feet (180 m) thick.

== Fossil content ==
The following fossils have been reported from the formation:

Bryozoans

- Fenestella acarinata
- F. crockfordae
- F. hamithensis
- F. rarinodosa
- F. serratula
- F. tooelensis
- F. trifurcata
- Hemitrypa reticulata
- Polypora micronodosa
- P. stansburyensis
- Ptylopora eliasi
- Septopora sp.

== See also ==
- List of fossiliferous stratigraphic units in Utah
- Paleontology in Utah
