= Mahogany Mountain (Utah) =

Mountain in Utah County, Utah, United States

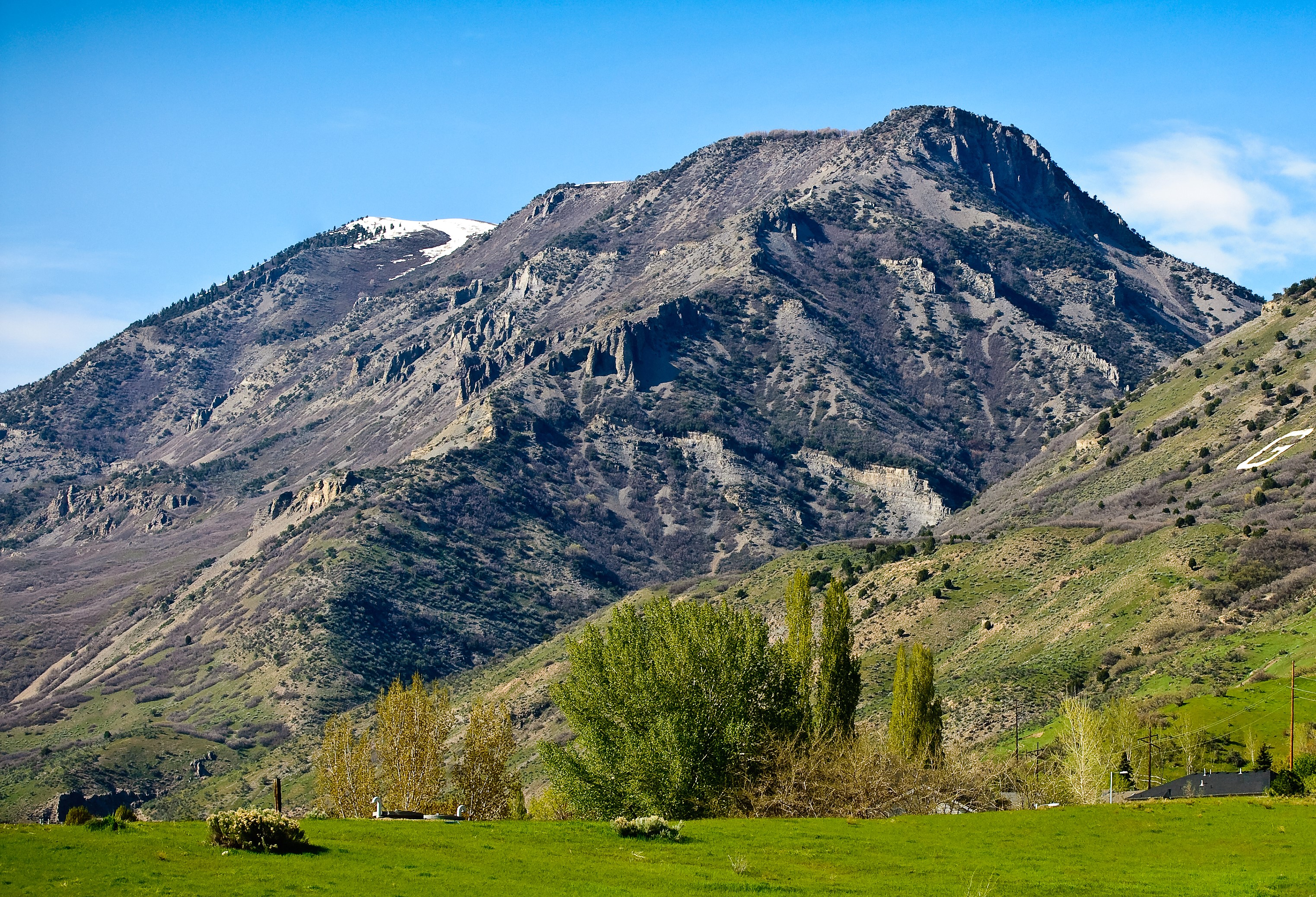
- South aspect

Highest point
- Elevation: 9,000 ft (2,743 m)
- Prominence: 634 ft (193 m)
- Parent peak: North Timpanogos (11,452 ft)
- Isolation: 2.45 mi (3.94 km)
- Coordinates: 40°24′36″N 111°42′51″W

Naming
- Etymology: Mountain Mahogany

Geography
- Location within Utah Location within the United States
- Country: United States
- State: Utah
- County: Utah
- Protected area: Wasatch–Cache National Forest
- Parent range: Wasatch Range; Rocky Mountains
- Topo map: USGS Timpanogos Cave

Geology
- Rock age: Mississippian
- Rock type: Limestone

Climbing
- Easiest route: class 1+ hiking

Mahogany Mountain is a 9,000-foot-elevation (2,743-meter) summit in Utah County, Utah, United States.

== Description ==
Mahogany Mountain is located immediately north of Pleasant Grove, on land managed by Wasatch–Cache National Forest. The peak is set in the Wasatch Range which is a subrange of the Rocky Mountains. The mountain is composed of Great Blue Limestone which formed during the Mississippian subperiod of the geologic record. Precipitation runoff from the mountain drains to Utah Lake, approximately six miles (9.7 km) to the southwest. Topographic relief is significant as the summit rises 4,100 feet (1,250 meters) above the town of Cedar Hills in two miles (3.2 km). This mountain's toponym has been officially adopted by the United States Board on Geographic Names.

== Gallery ==
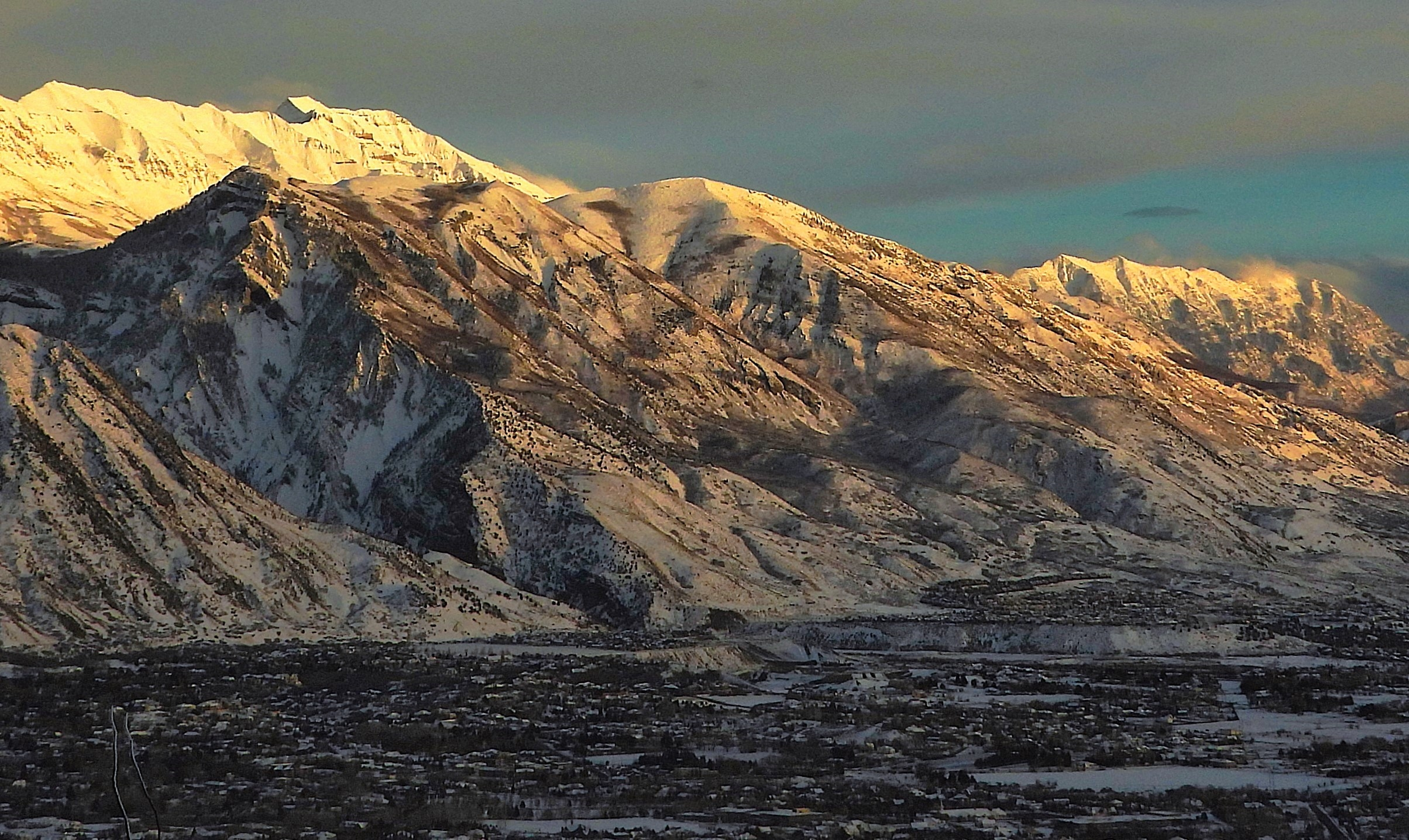
Northwest aspect of Mahogany Mountain centered
(Mount Timpanogos upper left)

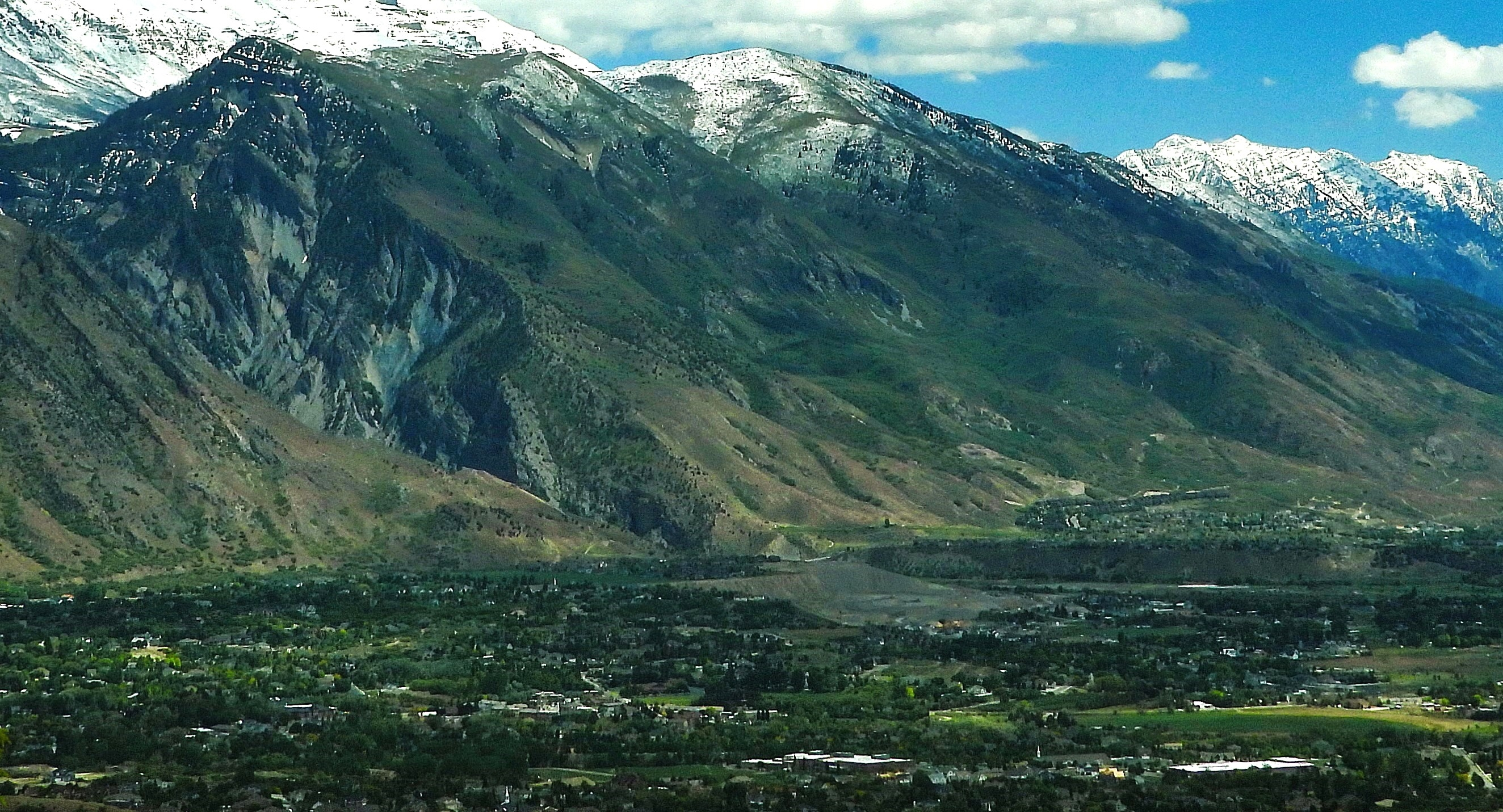
Northwest aspect of Mahogany Mountain rises above the city of Alpine, Utah

== See also ==
- List of mountains in Utah
