= Nugget Sandstone =

Geologic Formation in the United States

- Stratigraphic range: Norian-Toarcian; ~220–180 Ma
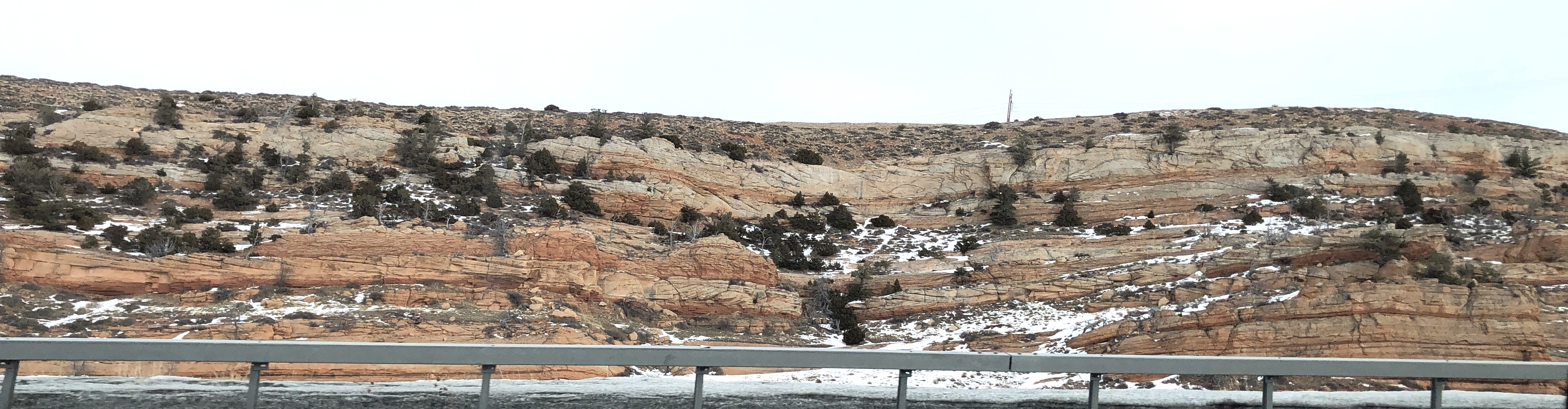
- Salmon-pink and white sandstones of the upper part of the Nugget Formation, Wind River Mountains, Wyoming
- Type: Geological formation
- Unit of: Glen Canyon Group
- Underlies: Carmel Formation
- Overlies: Chinle Formation
- Thickness: 200 m (660 ft)

Lithology
- Primary: Sandstone
- Other: Mudstone, siltstone

Location
- Coordinates: 40.4°N 109.3°W
- Approximate paleocoordinates: 27.4°N 46.6°W
- Region: Colorado, Idaho, Utah
- Country: United States
- Extent: Colorado Plateau
- Nugget Sandstone (the United States) Nugget Sandstone (Utah)

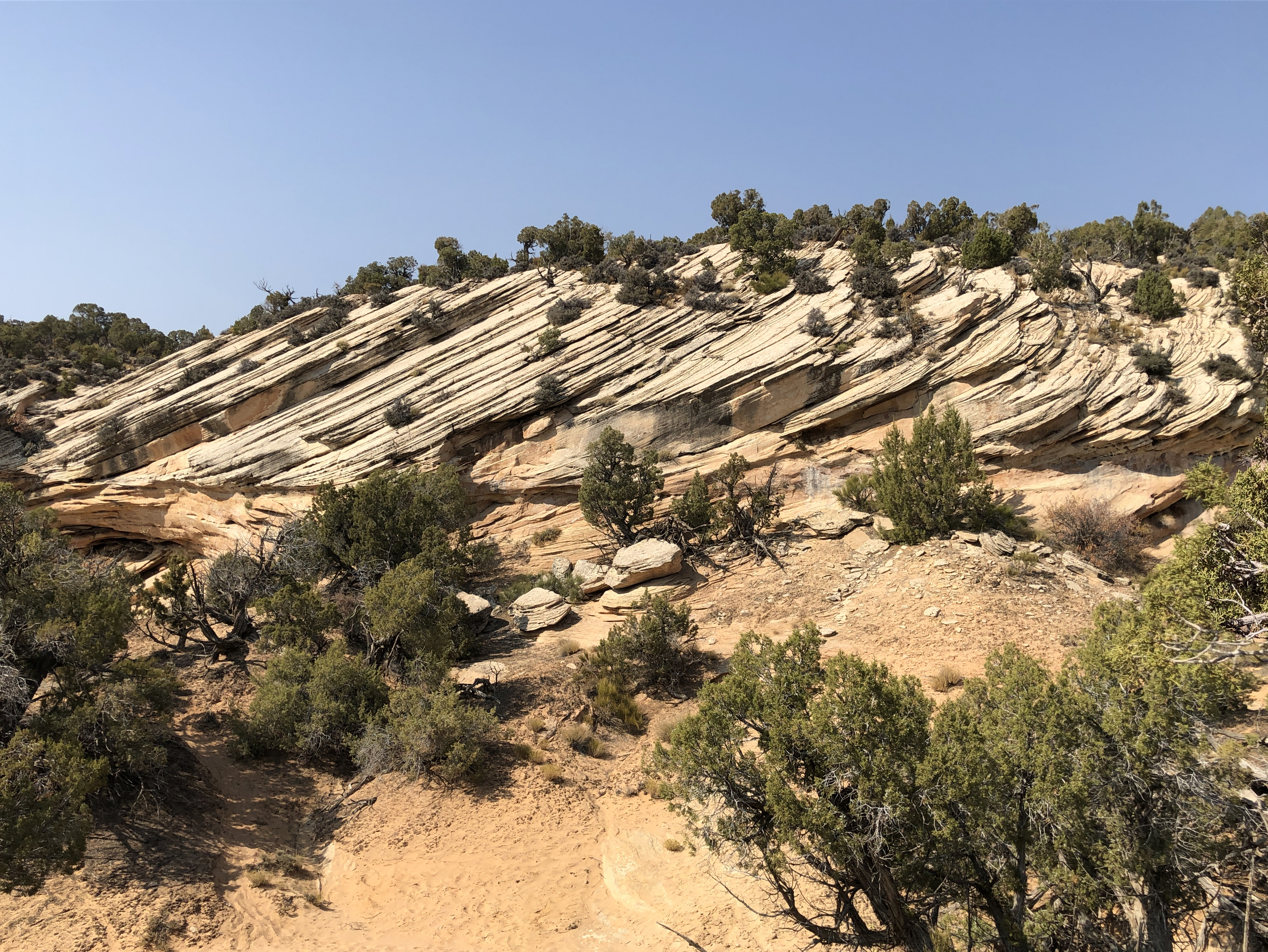
Nugget Sandstone near Red Fleet Reservoir, Uintah County, Utah. Uniform grain size and these large cross-stratification are indicative of an ancient sand dune.

Nugget Sandstone showing a bounding surface between two sets of ancient sand dunes, where wind scour eroded the top of the lower dune before the second dune advanced over it. Red Fleet Reservoir, Uintah County, Utah.

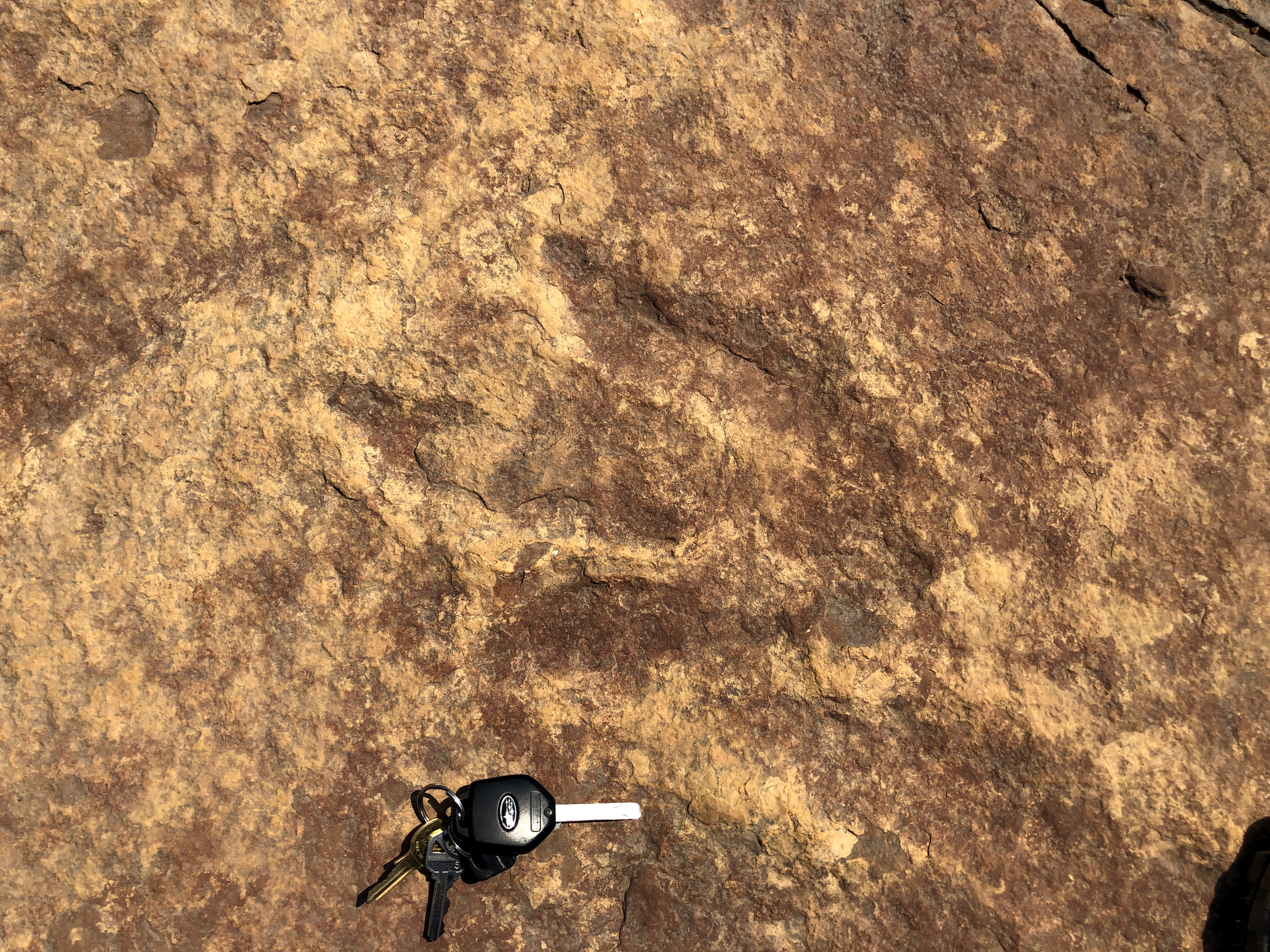
Eubrontes track in the Nugget Sandstone, Red Fleet State Park, Uintah County, Utah.

The Nugget Sandstone is a Late Triassic to Early Jurassic geologic formation that outcrops in Colorado, Idaho, Wyoming, and Utah, western United States.

In Wyoming, it is composed of a lower hematite-stained siltstone and thin-bedded sandstone. The upper part is a salmon-pink and light-gray, fine- to medium-grained cliff-forming sandstone that exhibits massive bedding to large scale cross-beds of dunes. Thickness ranges up to 86.9 m (285 feet).

Fossil theropod tracks have been reported from the formation.

== Fossil content ==
Intermediate theropod, sphenosuchian, drepanosaurid and sphenodontian remains are known.

Paleofauna reported from the Nugget Sandstone
Genus	Species	Material	Notes	Images
Caelestiventus	C. hanseni	Most of the skull, a complete lower jaw, a finger bone	A dimorphodontid pterosaur; one of the earliest known diagnostic pterosaurs in North America.	

Other fossils

- Rhynchosauroides sp.
- Lepidosauria indet.

=== Ichnofossils ===
- Batrachopus sp.
- Brachychirotherium sp.
- Brasilichnium sp.
- Cochlichnus sp.
- Diplichnites sp.
- Grallator (Eubrontes)
- Gwyneddichnium sp.
- Octopodichnus sp.
- Otozoum sp.
- cf. Paleohelcura sp.
- Pterichnus sp.
- Scoyenia sp.
- Treptichnus sp.
- ?Acanthichnus sp.
- ?Apatopus sp.

== See also ==
- List of pterosaur-bearing stratigraphic units
- List of dinosaur-bearing rock formations
  - List of stratigraphic units with theropod tracks
