= Evacuation Creek Formation =

Geologic formation

- Stratigraphic range: Paleogene
- Type: Formation

Location
- Region: Utah
- Country: United States

The Evacuation Creek Formation is a geologic formation in Utah, United States. It preserves fossils dating back to the Paleogene period.

== See also ==
- List of fossiliferous stratigraphic units in Utah
- Paleontology in Utah
