= Soapstone Formation =

Geologic formation in Utah, USA

- Stratigraphic range: Carboniferous
- Type: Formation

Location
- Region: Utah
- Country: United States

The Soapstone Formation is a geologic formation in Utah, United States. It preserves fossils dating back to the Carboniferous period.

The formation has an average thickness of 300 ft (91 m) and consists of dark gray, soft fissile clayey shale with minor amounts of gray calcisiltite and siltstone.

== See also ==
- List of fossiliferous stratigraphic units in Utah
- Paleontology in Utah
