= Bingham Mine Formation =

Geologic formation in Utah, United States

- Stratigraphic range: Carboniferous
- Type: Formation

Location
- Region: Utah
- Country: United States

The Bingham Mine Formation is a geologic formation in Utah. It preserves fossils dating back to the Carboniferous period.

== See also ==
- List of fossiliferous stratigraphic units in Utah
- Paleontology in Utah
