= San Rafael Group =

Group of geological formations exposed in the western US

- Stratigraphic range: Middle Jurassic
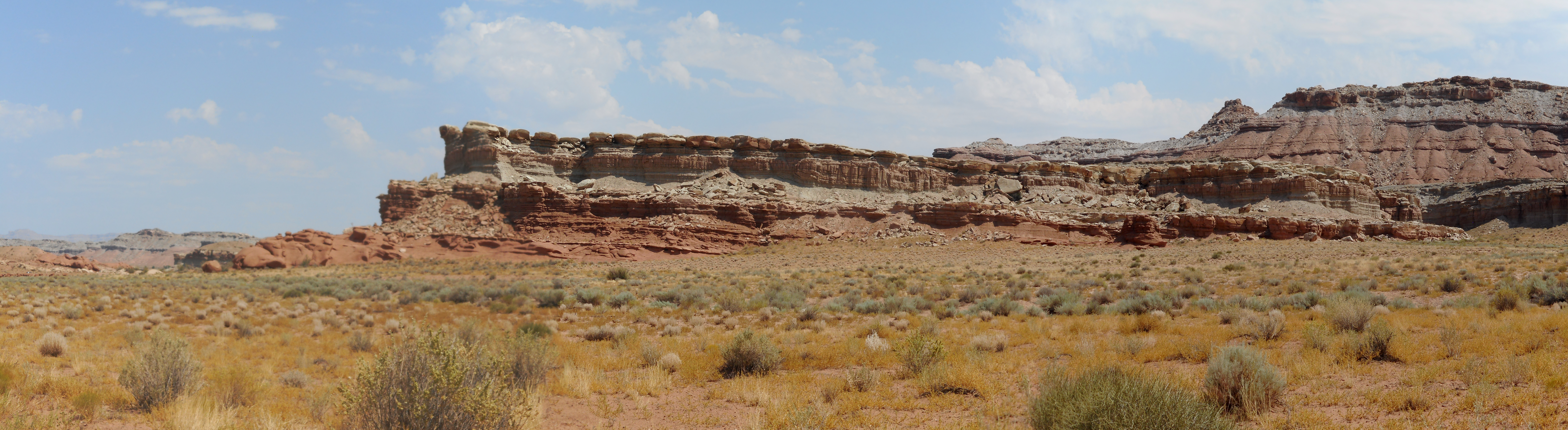
- San Rafael Group on the east side of the San Rafael Swell. Entrada at the base, overlain by the Curtis, then Summerville, and capped by the Morrison (Tidwell and Salt Wash Members).
- Type: Group
- Underlies: Morrison Formation
- Overlies: Glen Canyon Group
- Thickness: 490 meters (1,610 ft)

Lithology
- Primary: Sandstone
- Other: Mudstone, limestone

Location
- Coordinates: 39.174°N 110.466°W
- Region: Four Corners
- Country: United States

Type section
- Named for: San Rafael Reef
- Named by: Gilluly and Reeside
- Year defined: 1928
- San Rafael Group (the United States) San Rafael Group (Utah)

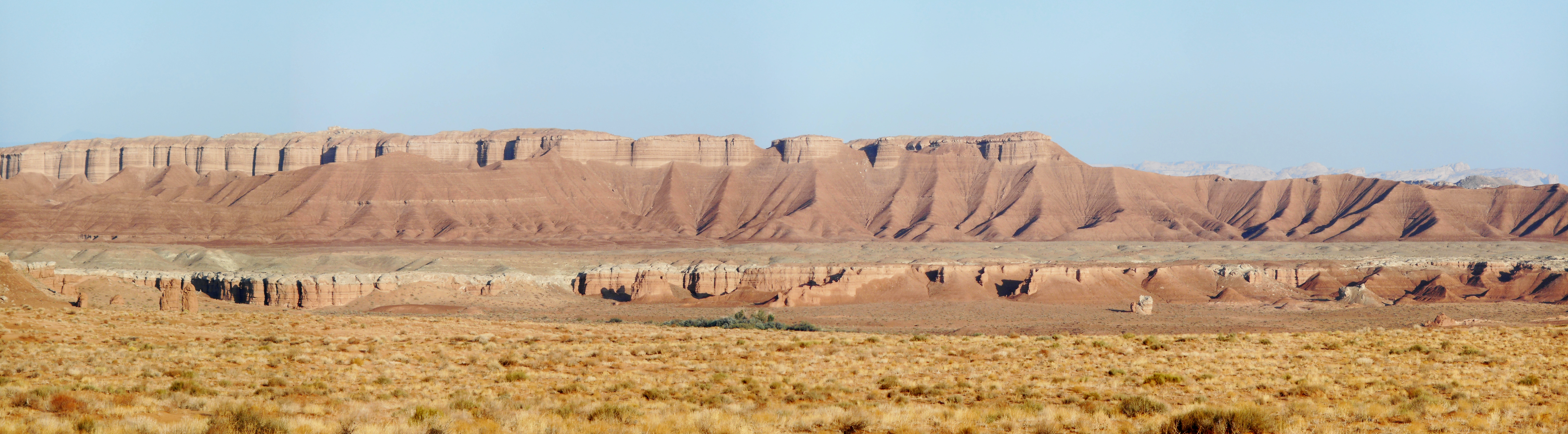
San Rafael Group strata exposed east of the San Rafael Swell, north of Hanksville. Sequence from orange cliff in foreground to cliff top in background Entrada Formation, Curtis Formation, Summerville Formation, capped by the (pink) Tidwell Member of the Morrison Formation.

The San Rafael Group is a geologic group or collection of related rock formations that is spread across the U.S. states of New Mexico, Arizona, Utah and Colorado. As part of the Colorado Plateau, this group of formations was laid down in the Middle Jurassic during the Bajocian, Bathonian and Callovian Stages.

== Description ==
The group consists of Jurassic beds younger than the Navajo Sandstone and older than the Morrison Formation. These show marine influence in their formation in the northwestern exposures at San Rafael Swell, with formations composed of limestone, mudstone, gypsum, and silty sandstone. Further east, the group becomes more continental in character, with the Entrada Formation resembling the underlying clean sandstones of the Glen Canyon Group. The group is up to 490 meters (1,610 ft) thick.

== Subunits ==
Subunits by basin:

Black Mesa Basin:

- Entrada Sandstone (youngest)
- Carmel Formation
- Page Sandstone (oldest)

Great Basin province:

- Entrada Sandstone (youngest)
- Page Sandstone
- Carmel Formation
- Temple Cap Sandstone (oldest)

Peterson concluded that the Henrieville Sandstone was simply the bleached upper zone of the Entrada Sandstone and recommended abandoning the formation.

Palo Duro Basin/Sierra Grande Uplift:

- Entrada Formation (youngest)
- Bell Ranch Formation (oldest)

Paradox Basin:

- Summerville Formation (youngest)
- Curtis Formation
- Carmel Formation
- Entrada Sandstone
- Page Sandstone (oldest)

Piceance Basin:

- Summerville Formation (youngest)
- Entrada Sandstone (oldest)

Plateau Sedimentary Province:

- Romana Sandstone (youngest)
- Entrada Sandstone
- Carmel Formation
- Page Sandstone

San Juan Basin:

- Cow Springs Sandstone
- Wanakah Formation
- Entrada Sandstone

southern San Juan Basin:

- Zuni Sandstone (youngest)
- Bluff Formation
- Summerville Formation
- Todilto Formation
- Entrada Sandstone (oldest)

== History of investigation ==
There is no designated type locality for the group. It was named for exposures in the San Rafael Swell in Emery County, Utah by James Gilluly and J.B. Reeside in 1928. They divided the group into (ascending): Carmel Formation, Entrada Sandstone (new), Curtis Formation (new), and Summerville Formation (new). Areal extent limits were established by Herbert E. Gregory and Raymond Cecil Moore in 1931. Smith in 1954 revised and divided the group into Entrada, Todilto, and Thoreau (new) formations in the San Juan Basin.

In 1959 another revision, this time by Griggs and Read, divided it into Entrada and Bell Ranch (new) formations in the Palo Duro Basin and Sierra Grande Uplift. The Carmel-Navajo contact was revised by Wright and others in 1962 and the Carmel-Entrada contact was revised by Phoenix in 1963. Thompson and Stokes created an overview and named the Henrieville Sandstone in 1970. The Temple Cap Sandstone was revised and the Page Sandstone added (new) by Peterson and Pipiringos in 1979. A revision by O'Sullivan in 1980 divided the group into Carmel, Entrada, and Wanakah formations in Paradox Basin. O'Sullivan revised the upper contact in 1984.

In 1988 Peterson revised earlier work and divided the group into Page, Carmel, and Entrada formations in the Black Mesa Basin; divided it into Page, Carmel, Entrada and Romana (new) formations in the Plateau Sedimentary Province; and divided it into Page, Carmel, Entrada, Curtis, and Summerville formations in Paradox Basin. Condon in 1989 revised the group in San Juan Basin and divided it into Entrada and Wanakah formations in southeastern area; divided it into Entrada, Wanakah, and Cow Springs formations in south-central area; and divided it into Entrada and Cow Springs Sandstones in southwestern area.
