= Nugget Formation =

Geologic Formation

- Stratigraphic range: Jurassic
- Type: Formation

Location
- Region: Utah
- Country: United States

The Nugget Formation is a geologic formation in Utah. It preserves fossils dating back to the Jurassic period.

== See also ==
- List of fossiliferous stratigraphic units in Utah
- Paleontology in Utah
