= Kanosh Formation =

Geologic formation in Utah and Nevada, United States

- Stratigraphic range: Middle Ordovician
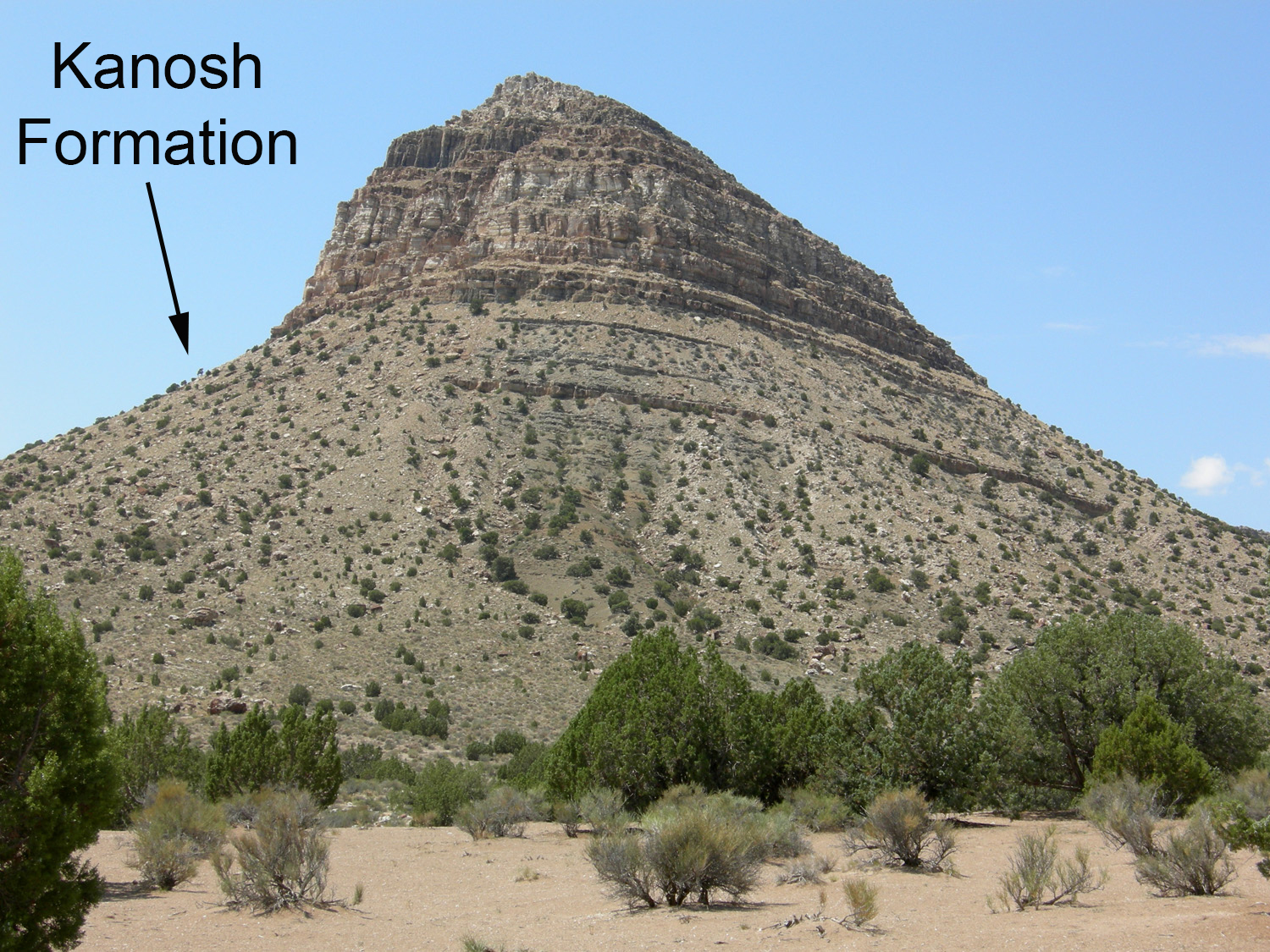
- Kanosh Formation exposed on the flanks of Fossil Mountain, Millard County, Utah
- Type: Formation
- Underlies: Lehman Formation
- Overlies: Juab Formation
- Thickness: About 100 m (330 ft) in Utah

Lithology
- Primary: Shale
- Other: Limestone

Location
- Region: Nevada, Utah
- Country: United States

Type section
- Named for: Kanosh, Utah

The Kanosh Formation is a geologic formation in Utah and Nevada. It preserves fossils dating back to the Middle Ordovician period.

== See also ==
- List of fossiliferous stratigraphic units in Nevada
- List of fossiliferous stratigraphic units in Utah
- Paleontology in Nevada
- Paleontology in Utah
