= Carmel Formation =

Geological formation in Utah, U.S.

- Stratigraphic range: Bajocian–Callovian
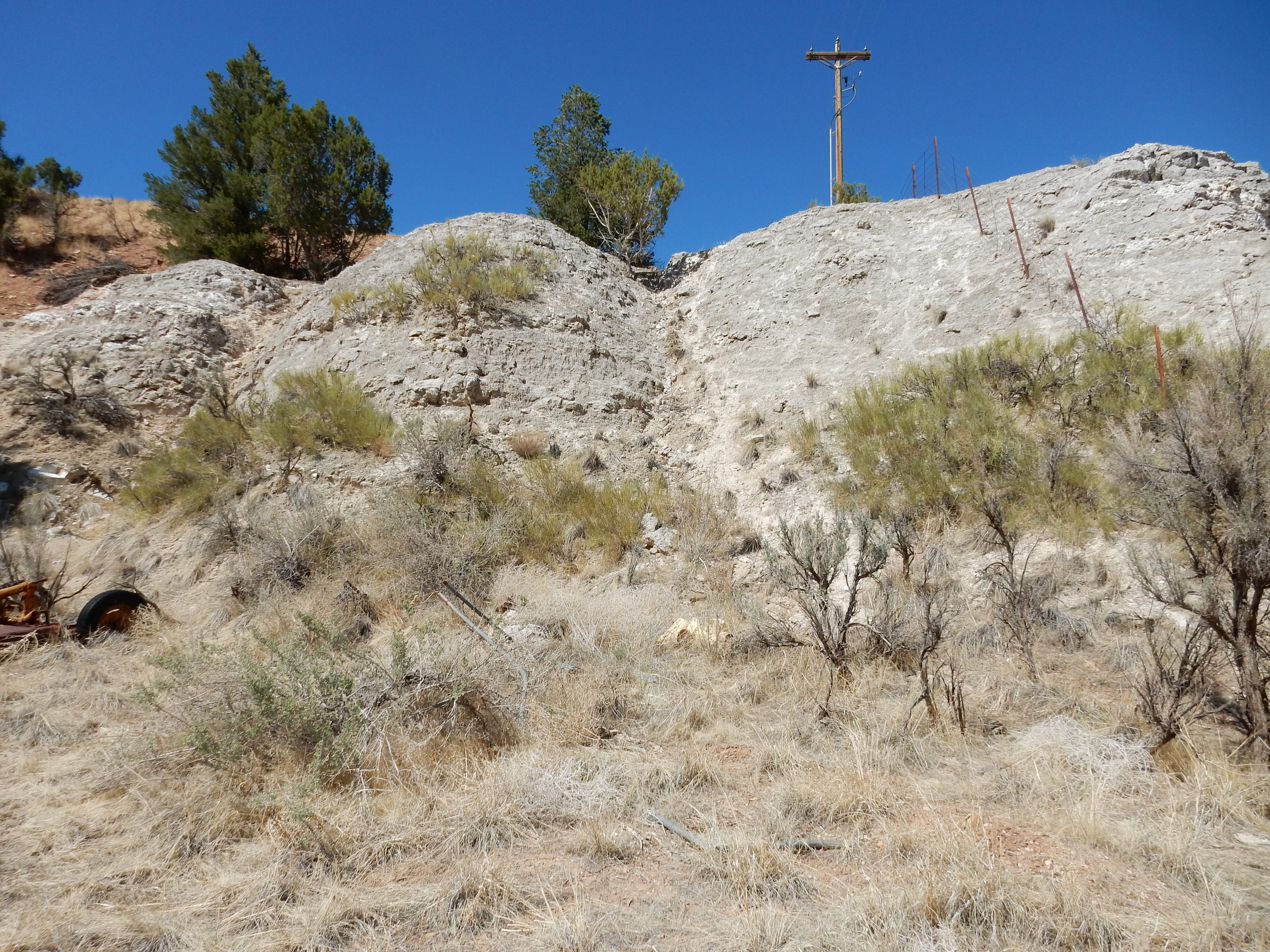
- Carmel Formation at its type location, Mount Carmel, Utah
- Type: Geological formation
- Unit of: San Rafael Group
- Underlies: Entrada Sandstone
- Overlies: Navajo Sandstone, Temple Cap Formation, Nugget Sandstone
- Thickness: From 200 feet (60 m) to 1,000 feet (300 m)

Lithology
- Primary: Mudstone
- Other: Sandstone, siltstone, limestone

Location
- Coordinates: 37.251°N 112.663°W
- Region: Wyoming, Utah, Colorado, north east Arizona and New Mexico
- Country: US

Type section
- Named for: Mount Carmel
- Named by: Gilluly and Reeside
- Year defined: 1928
- Carmel Formation (the United States) Carmel Formation (Utah)

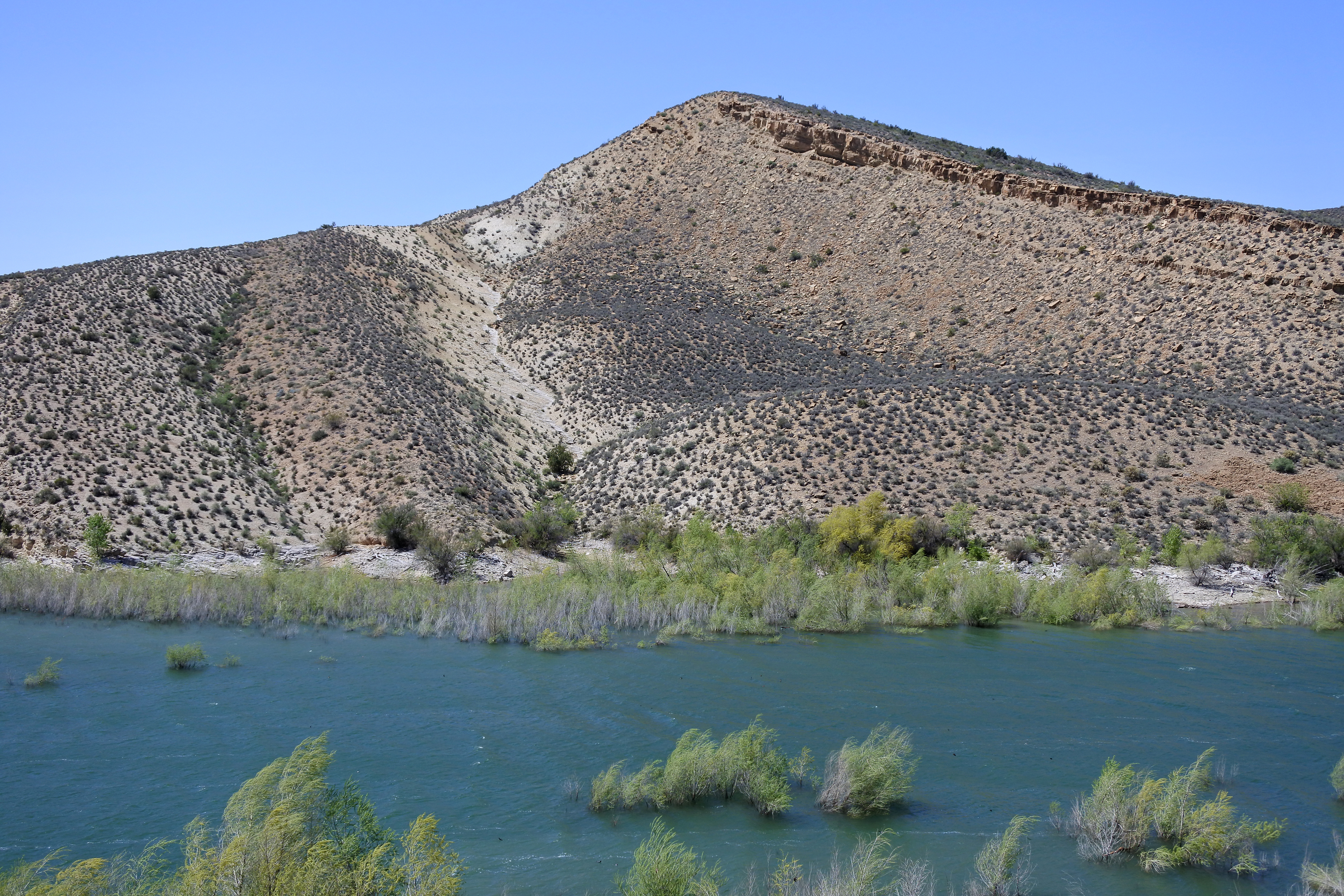
Carmel Formation exposed at Gunlock Reservoir, southwestern Utah

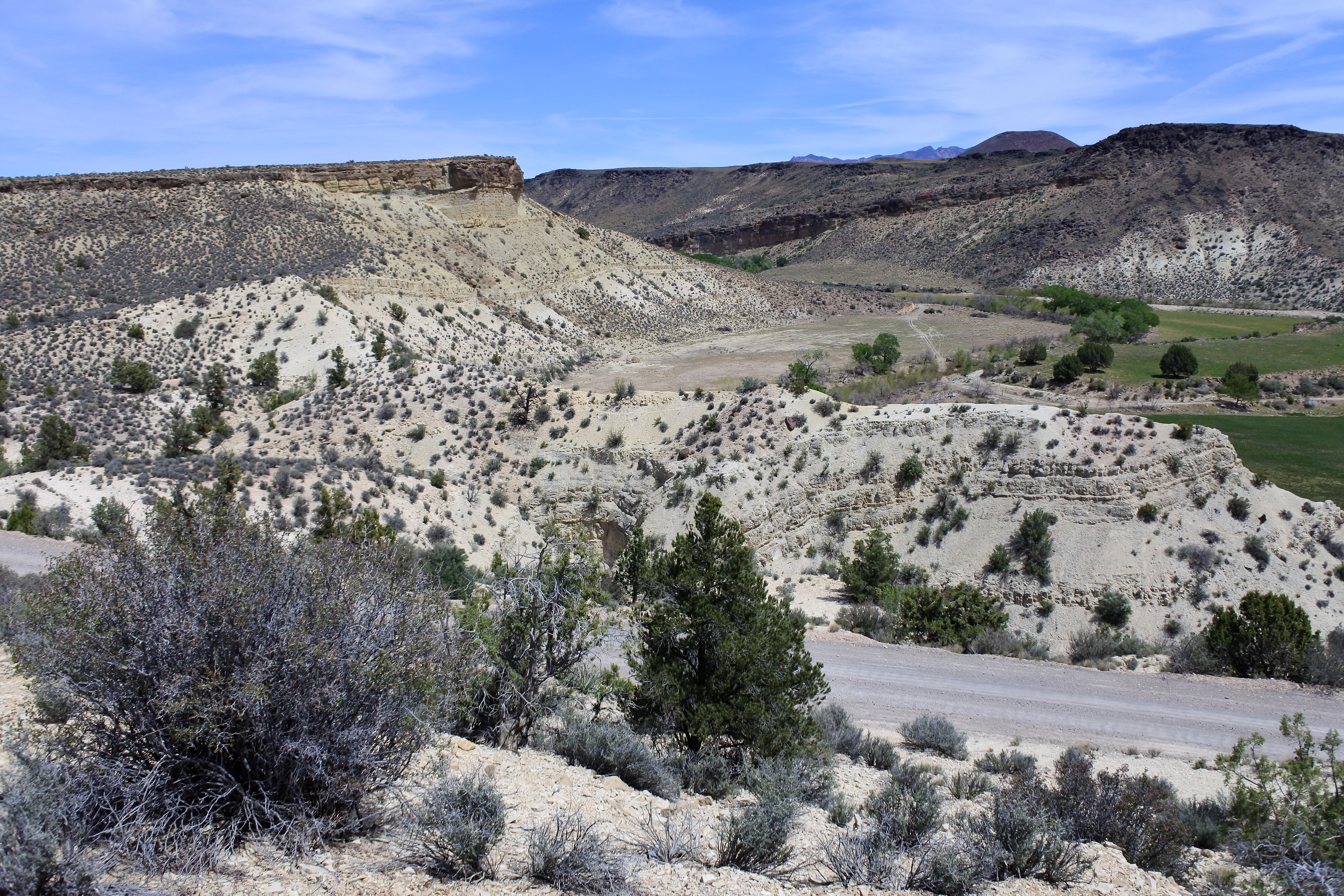
Carmel Formation near Gunlock, Utah. The unconformably overlying dark unit is the Upper Cretaceous Iron Springs Formation.

The Carmel Formation is a geologic formation in the San Rafael Group that is spread across the U.S. states of Wyoming, Utah, Colorado, north east Arizona and New Mexico. Part of the Colorado Plateau, this formation was laid down in the Middle Jurassic during the late Bajocian, through the Bathonian and into the early Callovian stages.

== Description ==
The Carmel Formation consists of up to 1,000 feet (300 m) of mudrock and sandstone interbedded with limestone and gypsum. It was laid down in a shallow marine to sabkha environment, into which terrigenous sediment was periodically carried. This gives the formation considerable lithological complexity. The formation is underlain by the Navajo Sandstone, with the regional J-2 unconformity separating the two formations, or by the Temple Cap Formation. Portions of the Carmel Formation grade laterally eastward into the Page Sandstone. The Carmel Formation in turn is overlain by the Entrada Formation.

In the type area of southern Utah, the Carmel Formation is divided into the Judd Hollow Member, a basal limestone member; the Crystal Creek Member, mostly mudstone and siltstone, which grades into the Page Sandstone to the east; the Paria River Member, which is also siltstone and mudstone but is separated from the Crystal Creek Member by gypsum beds; and the Winsor Member, which is mudstone, sandstone, and siltstone separated from the Paria River by a basal limestone. Further east, the limestone marker bed pinches out, and the Winsor Member and Paria River Member become indistinguishable and are informally termed the upper member. The upper member contains volcaniclastic beds of rhyolite originating in a volcanic arc just off the edge of the Colorado Plateau.

The formation preserves a Jurassic hardground, rare for North America.

== Subunits ==
Members (alphabetical):

- Co-op Creek Limestone Member (UT) (in place of the preempted name Kolob Limestone Member)
- Crystal Creek Member (UT)
- Homestake Limestone Member (UT*)
- Judd Hollow Member (AZ*, UT*) or Judd Hollow Tongue (AZ*, UT*)
- Paria River Member (UT*)
- Wiggler Wash Member (UT*)
- Winsor Member (UT*)

(Asterisks mean the name is used by the US Geological Survey)

== History of investigation ==
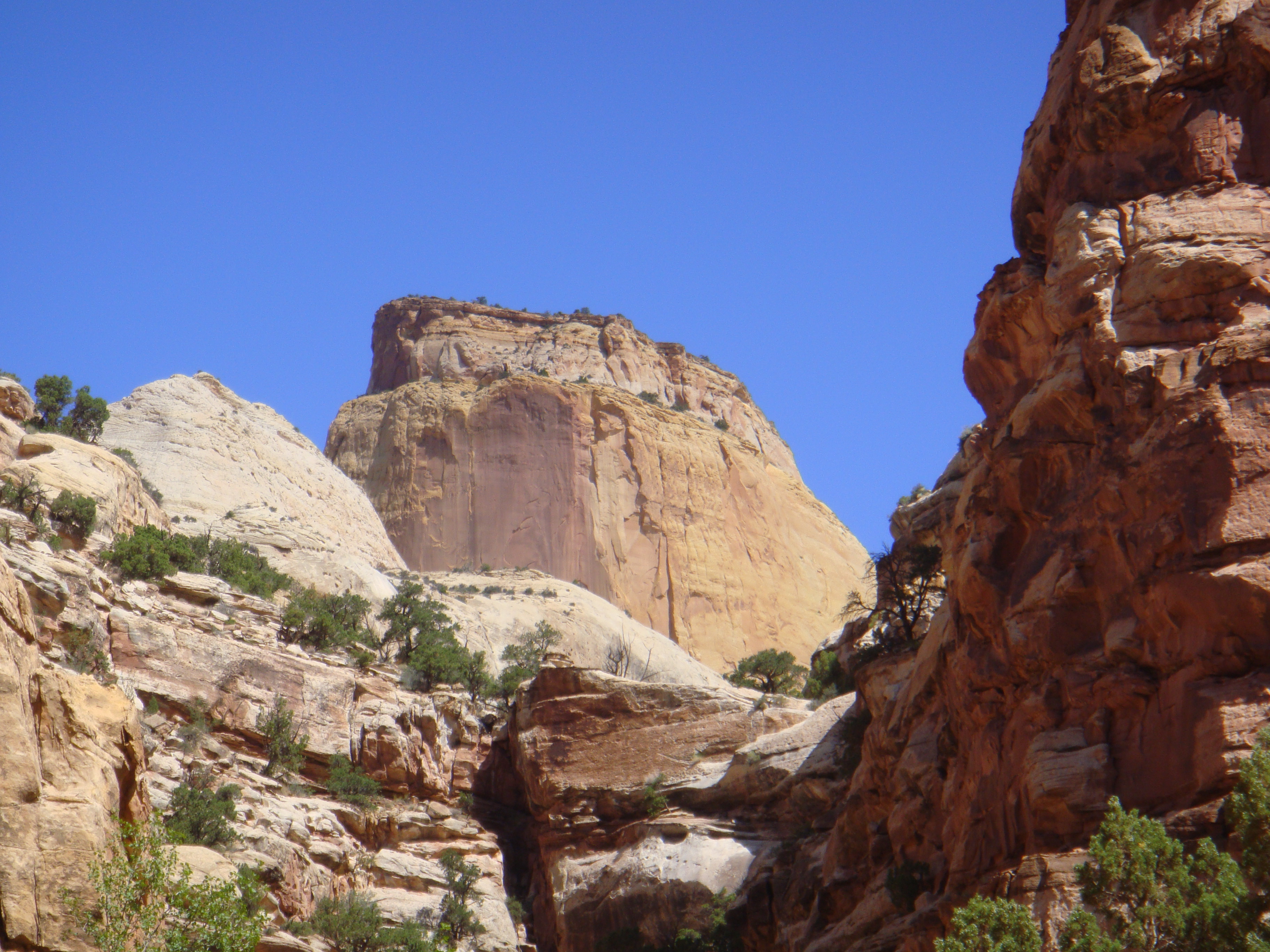
The Golden Throne, a rock formation in Capitol Reef National Park. Though the park is famous for white domes of the Navajo Sandstone, this dome's color is a result of a lingering section of yellow Carmel Formation carbonate, which has stained the underlying rock.

In 1928 Gilluly and Reeside stated an intent to name the formation after the village of Mount Carmel, Utah but did not give a type locality. They noted it as a basal formation in the San Rafael Group in San Rafael Swell, in Emery County, Utah. An overview along with a type locality and source of name was stated by Gregory and Moore in 1931. Mackin revised the formation's description and assigned the Homestake Limestone Member to it in 1954. Harshbarger and others created an overview in 1957. Its eastern areal limits were described by Wright and others in 1962. In 1963, western areal limits along with an overview were completed by Schultz and Wright. Another revision was done by Phoenix in 1963 who also added a Judd Hollow Tongue member. Isotopic dating was conducted by Marvin and others in 1965. The Kolob, Crystal Creek, Paria River, Winsor, and Wiggler Wash members were assigned by Thompson and Stokes in 1970. Areal limits were adjusted by O'Sullivan and Craig in 1973 and again in 1983 by Blakey and others. An overview was completed by Chapman in 1989. Hintze and others conducted isotopic dating and created an overview in 1994.

== Paleontological finds ==
There have been a number of paleontological finds within the Carmel Formation. Among these have been bryozoans, oysters, and dinosaur footprints.

=== Hardground mollusc community ===
The formation preserves a rare Jurassic hardground interpreted as a carbonate lagoon between oolitic shoals and a subtidal zone. The hardground community was dominated by bivalves such as Liostrea, Plicatula, and Modiolus. The ichnofossil Gastro-chaenolites is present, often with fossils of Lithophaga preserved inside. The rare bryozoan Arachnidium is found in attachment scars of Liostrea. Though bivalves were abundant, the community is lacking in the diversity seen in other Jurassic hardgrounds, suggesting a restricted shelf environment.

=== Bryozoans ===
Bryozoans found within the Carmel Formation include seven species of calcareous cyclostome bryozoans as well as a soft-bodied ctenostome bryozoan.

=== Gallery ===
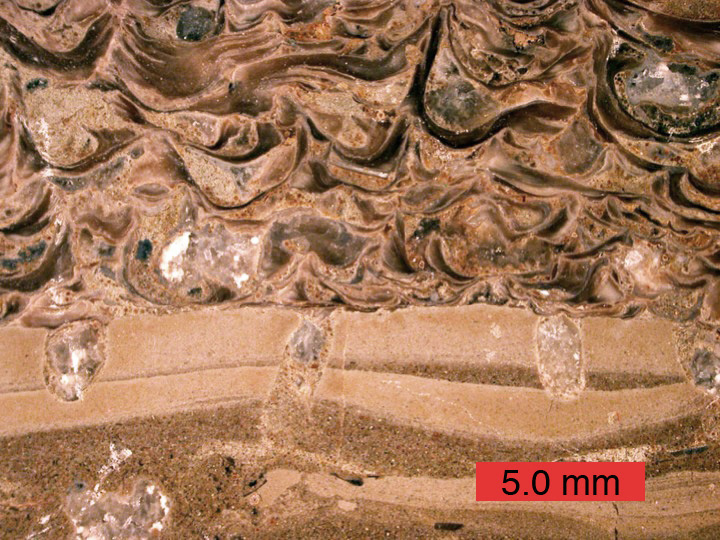
Cross-section of a carbonate hardground encrusted by oysters and bored by bivalves (Gastrochaenolites)

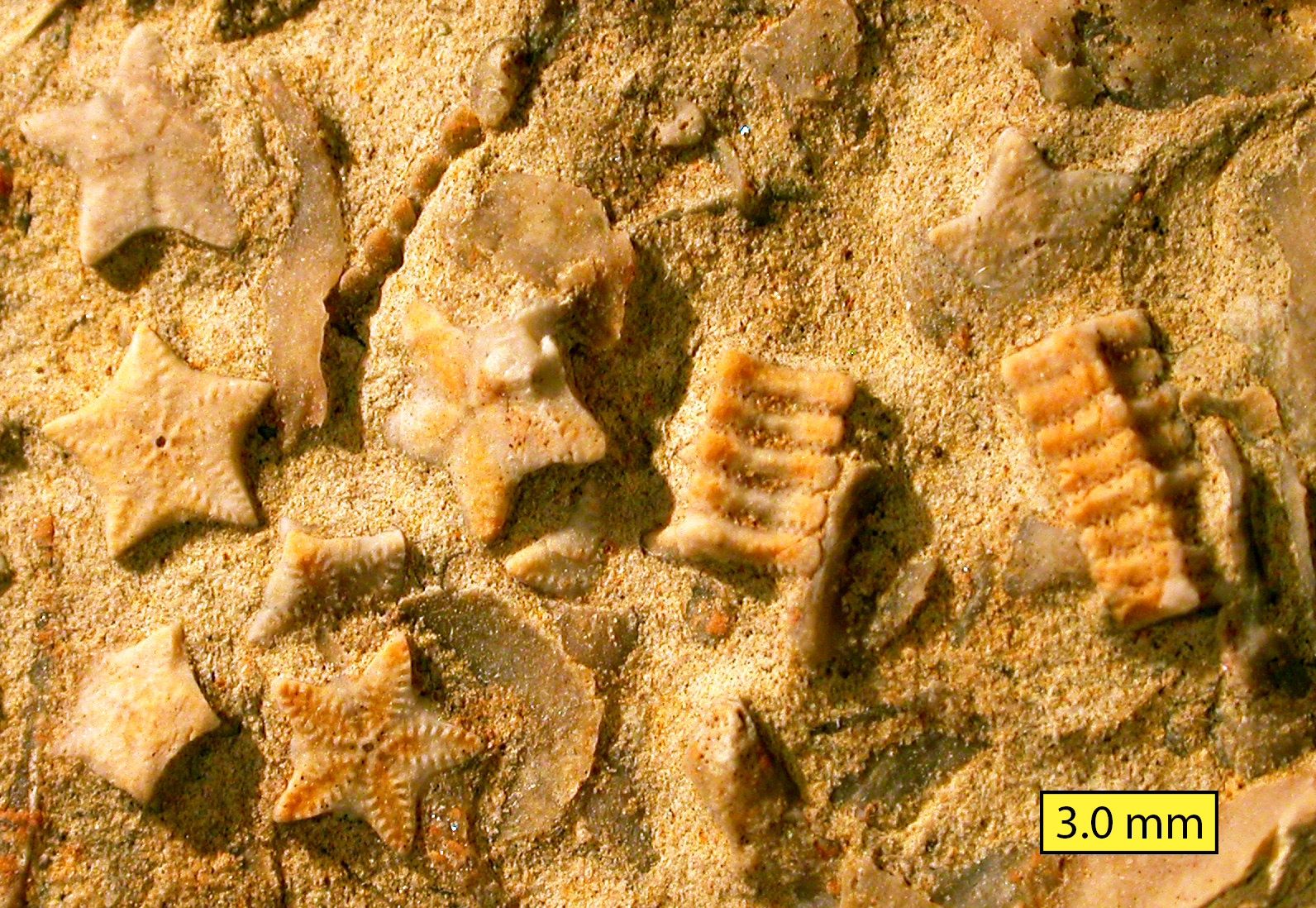
Biosparite/grainstone with crinoid columnals (Isocrinus nicoleti) from the Carmel Formation at Mount Carmel Junction, Utah.

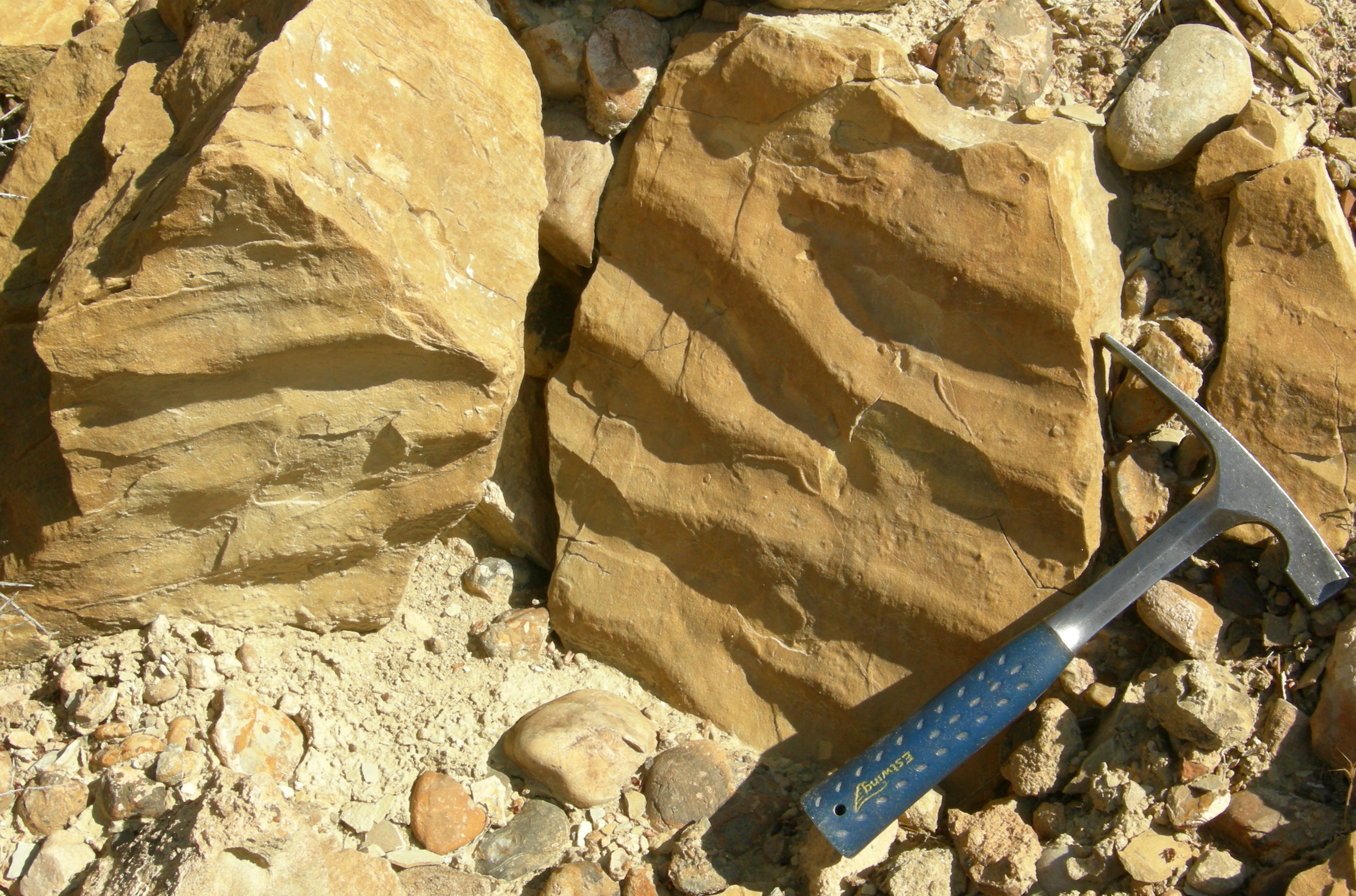
Ripplemarks in a biosparite/grainstone from the Carmel Formation, southwestern Utah.

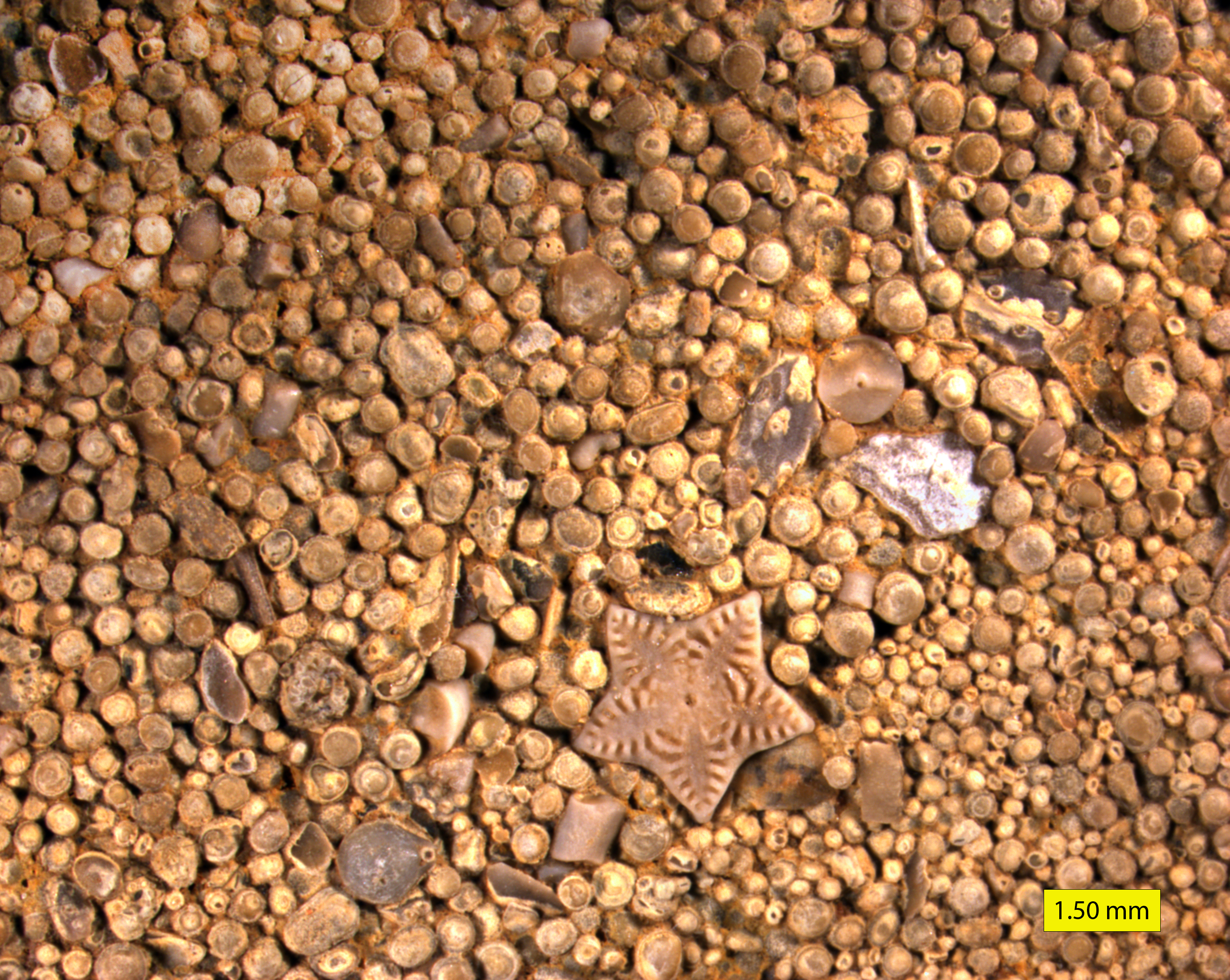
Ooids and crinoid columnals (Isocrinus nicoleti) on the surface of Carmel Formation limestone.

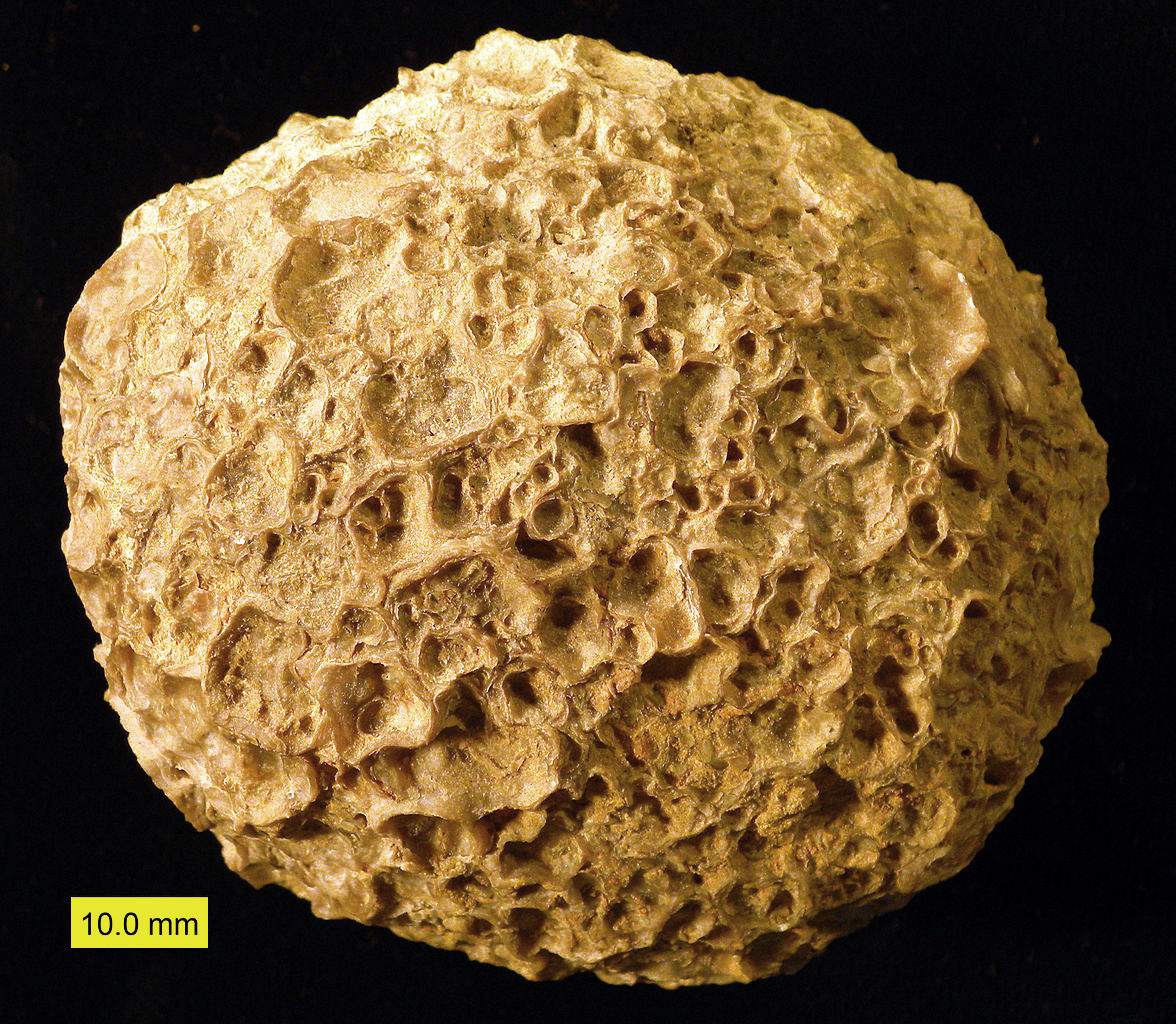
Ostreolith ("oyster ball") from the Carmel Formation, southwestern Utah.

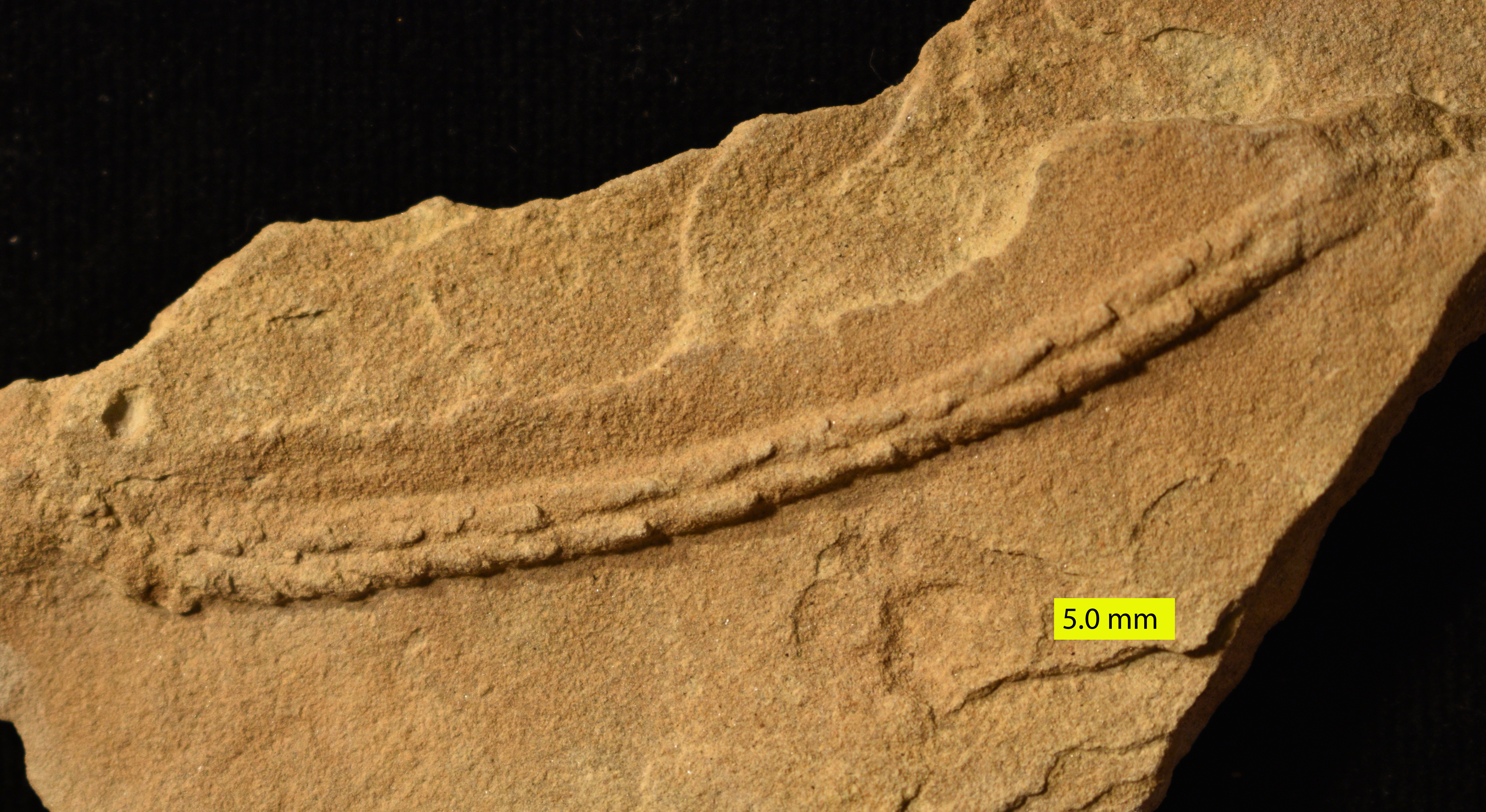
Trace fossil Gyrochorte from the Carmel Formation (Middle Jurassic) of SW Utah.

== Places found ==
Geologic Province:

- Black Mesa Basin*
- Capitol Reef National Park
- Great Basin province*
- Green River Basin*
- Paradox Basin*
- Plateau sedimentary province*
- San Juan Basin
- Uinta Basin*
- Uinta Uplift*
