= Kelvin Formation =

Geologic formation in Utah, USA

- Stratigraphic range: Aptian-Albian; ~120–100 Ma
- Type: Formation

Lithology
- Primary: Conglomerate

Location
- Coordinates: 40.9°N 111.3°W
- Approximate paleocoordinates: 41.2°N 64.6°W
- Region: Utah
- Country: United States
- Kelvin Formation (the United States) Kelvin Formation (Utah)

The Kelvin Formation is a geologic formation in Utah, United States. It preserves dinosaur fossil eggs dating back to the Aptian to Albian stages of the Cretaceous period.

== See also ==
- List of fossiliferous stratigraphic units in Utah
- Paleontology in Utah
