= Orr Formation =

Geologic formation in Utah, United States

- Stratigraphic range: Cambrian
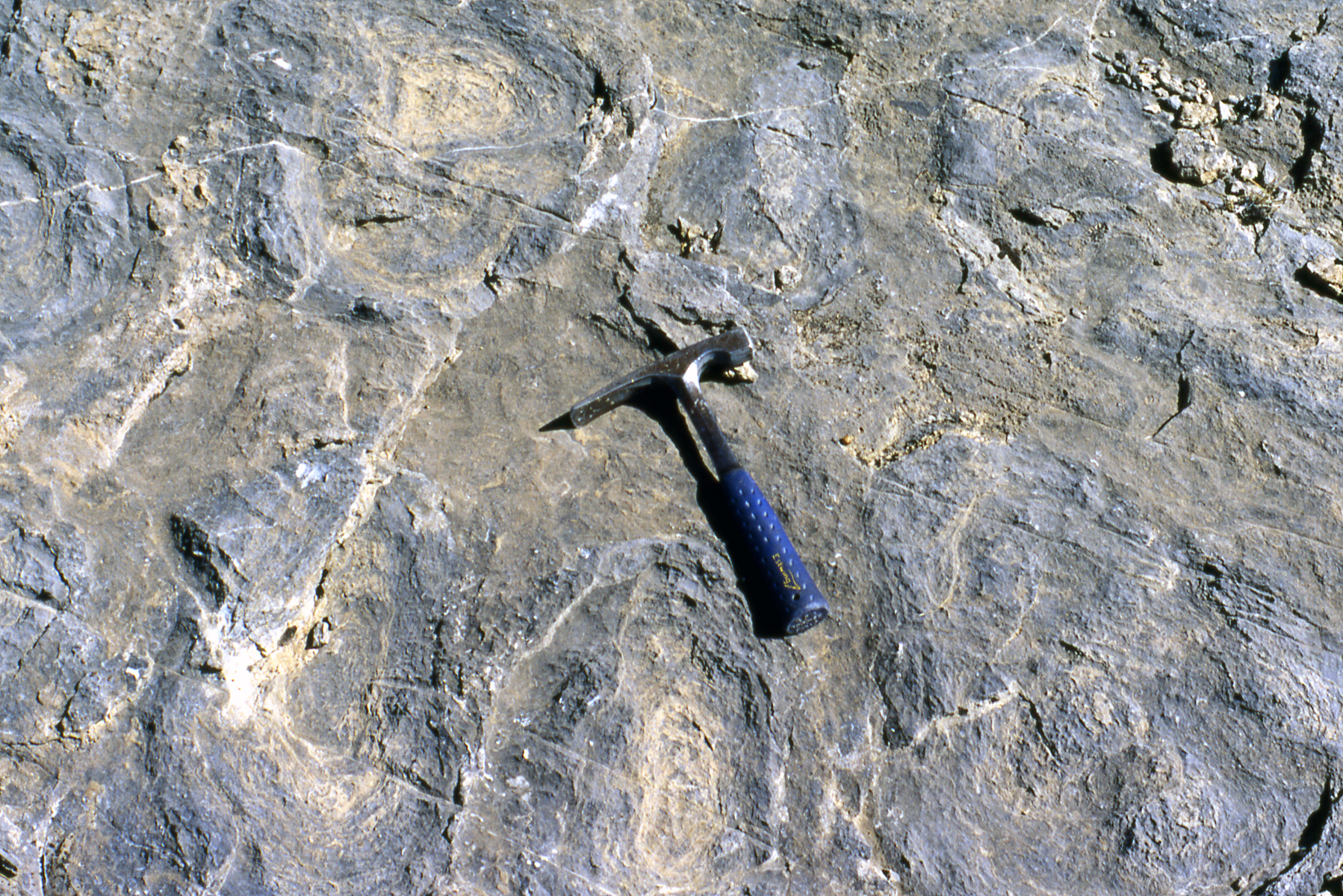
- Stromatolitic limestone (Big Horse Limestone Member; Utah)
- Type: Geological formation
- Sub-units: Big Horse Limestone Member
- Thickness: 1,825 feet

Location
- Region: Utah
- Country: United States
- Extent: House Range

Type section
- Named for: Orr Ridge
- Named by: Charles D. Walcott
- Year defined: 1910

The Orr Formation is a geologic formation in Utah. It preserves fossils dating back to the Cambrian period.

== See also ==
- List of fossiliferous stratigraphic units in Utah
- Paleontology in Utah
