= Swan Peak Formation =

Geologic formation in Utah, United States

- Stratigraphic range: Ordovician
- Type: Formation

Location
- Region: Utah, Nevada, Idaho
- Country: United States

The Swan Peak Formation is a geologic formation in Utah. It preserves fossils dating back to the Ordovician period.

== See also ==
- List of fossiliferous stratigraphic units in Utah
- Paleontology in Utah
