= Notch Peak Formation =

Geologic formation in Utah, United States

- Stratigraphic range: Cambrian
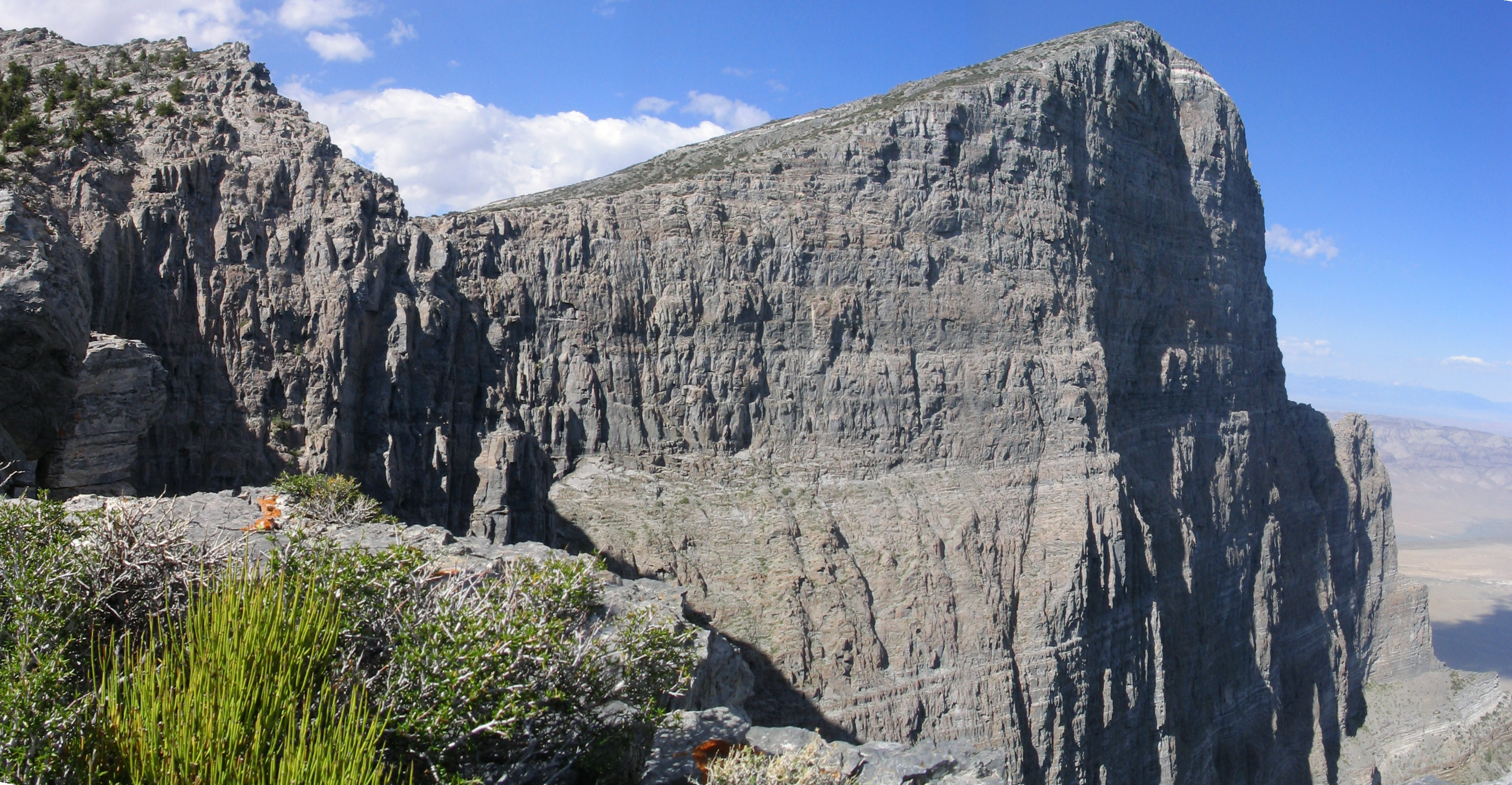
- Notch Peak with Notch Peak Formation
- Type: Geological formation
- Sub-units: Hellnmaria Member, Red Tops Member, Lava Dam Member
- Thickness: 1,890 feet

Lithology
- Primary: limestone
- Other: dolomite

Location
- Region: Utah, Nevada
- Country: United States
- Extent: House Range

Type section
- Named for: Notch Peak
- Named by: Charles D. Walcott
- Year defined: 1910

The Notch Peak Formation is a geologic formation in Utah. It preserves fossils dating back to the Cambrian period.

The Notch Peak Formation has three recognized members: Hellnmaria, Red Tops, and Lava Dam Members (in ascending order), all of which are composed of limestone and dolomite. It is named after the prominent peak of the same name in the House Range of Utah's West Desert, which is its type locality.

== See also ==
- List of fossiliferous stratigraphic units in Utah
- Paleontology in Utah
