= Deseret Limestone =

Geologic formation in Utah, United States

- Stratigraphic range: Carboniferous
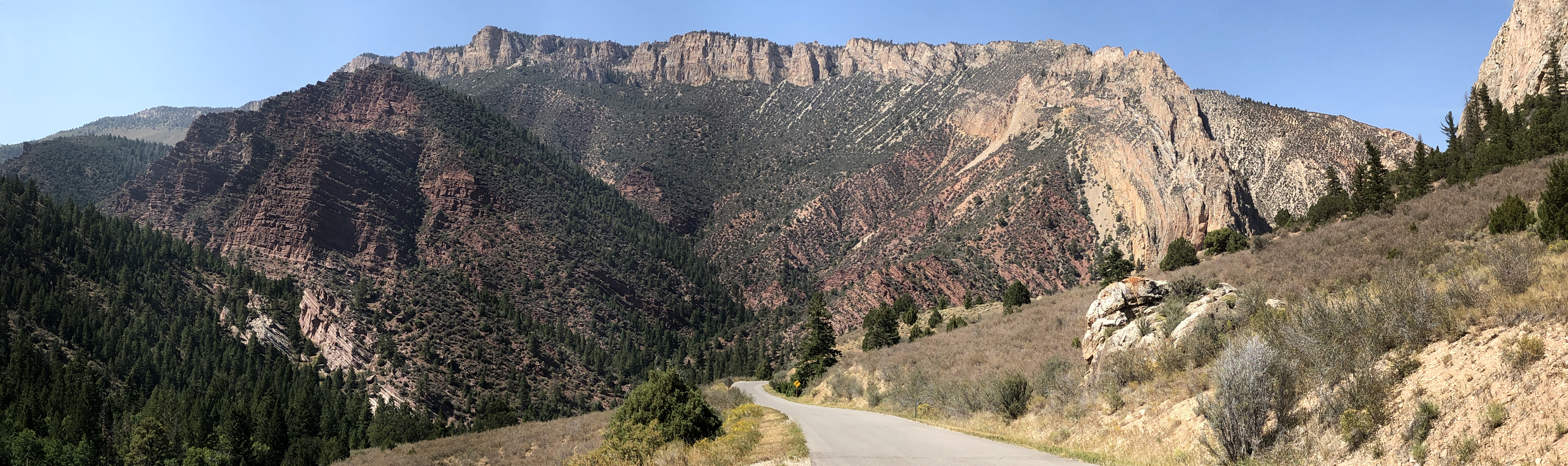
- Madison and Deseret Limestones to the right, neoproterozoic Hades Pass Formation to the left (Uinta Mountains, Utah)
- Type: Formation

Lithology
- Primary: dolomitic limestone
- Other: chert, shale

Location
- Region: Utah
- Country: United States

The Deseret Limestone, also known as the Pine Canyon Formation, is a geologic formation in Utah. It was formed by the Panthalassa ocean around 340 Ma. It preserves marine fossils dating back to the Carboniferous period or Mississippian age, mostly consisting of tabulate and rugose corals, and other marine invertebrates; vertebrates are represented by conodonts. The Deseret is a 500-foot thick layer of dolomitic limestone with chert, with a basal layer of black shale that is host rock for many Utah caves such as Timpanogos Cave National Monument.

== See also ==
- List of fossiliferous stratigraphic units in Utah
- Paleontology in Utah
