= Stump Formation =

Geologic formation in Utah, United States

- Stratigraphic range: Jurassic
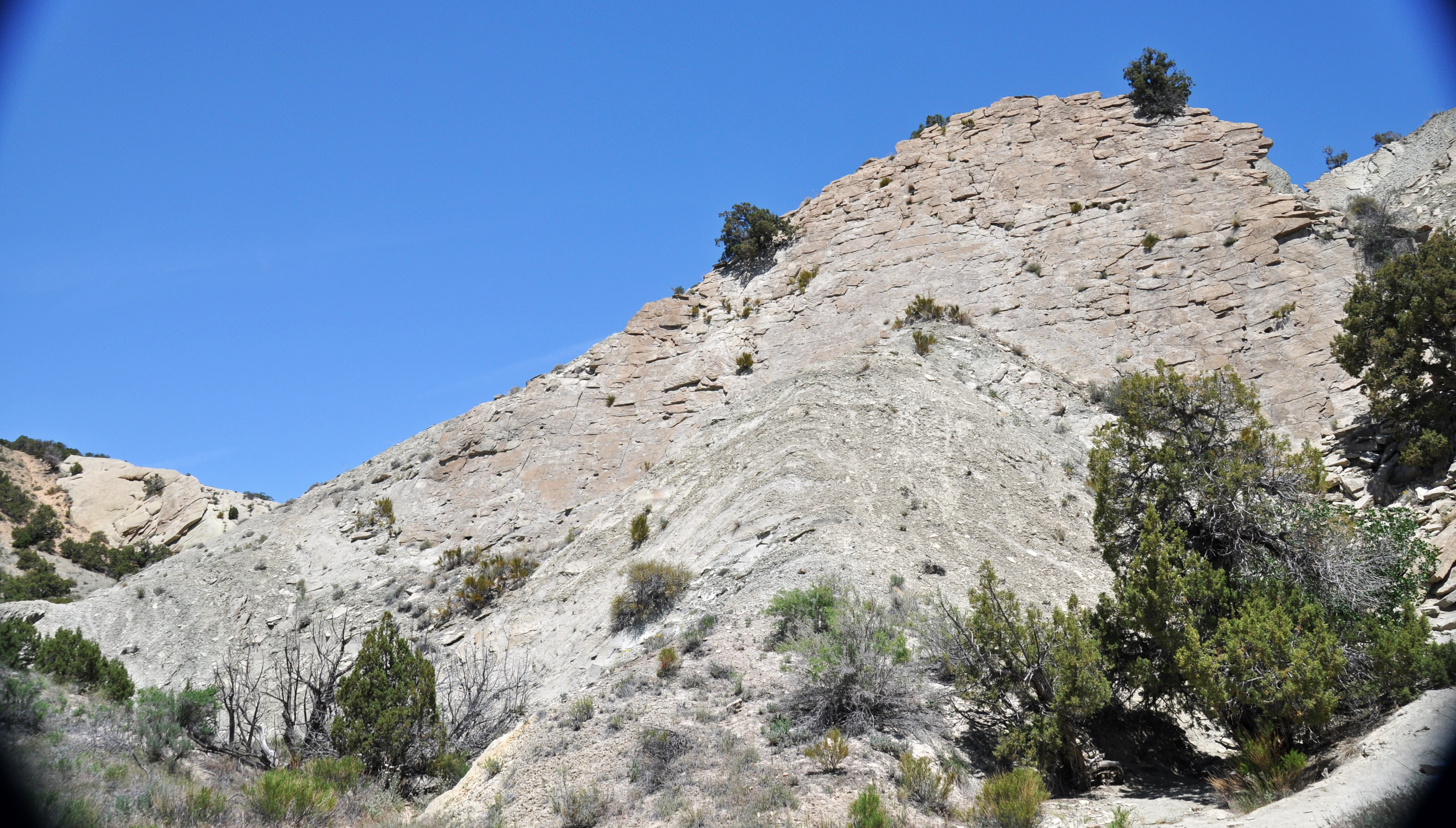
- Stump Formation in Dinosaur National Monument (Utah)
- Type: Formation

Location
- Region: Utah, Wyoming
- Country: United States

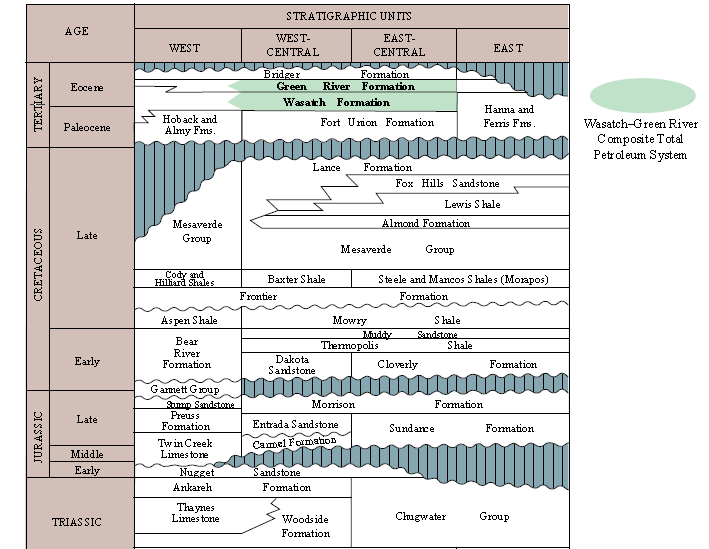
Stump Formation (sandstone) within Green River Basin stratigraphy

The Stump Formation is a geologic formation in Utah and Wyoming. It preserves fossils dating back to the Jurassic period.

== See also ==
- List of fossiliferous stratigraphic units in Utah
- Paleontology in Utah
