= Glen Canyon Group =

Group of geologic formations in the Colorado Plateau, USA

- Stratigraphic range: Rhaetian–Toarcian
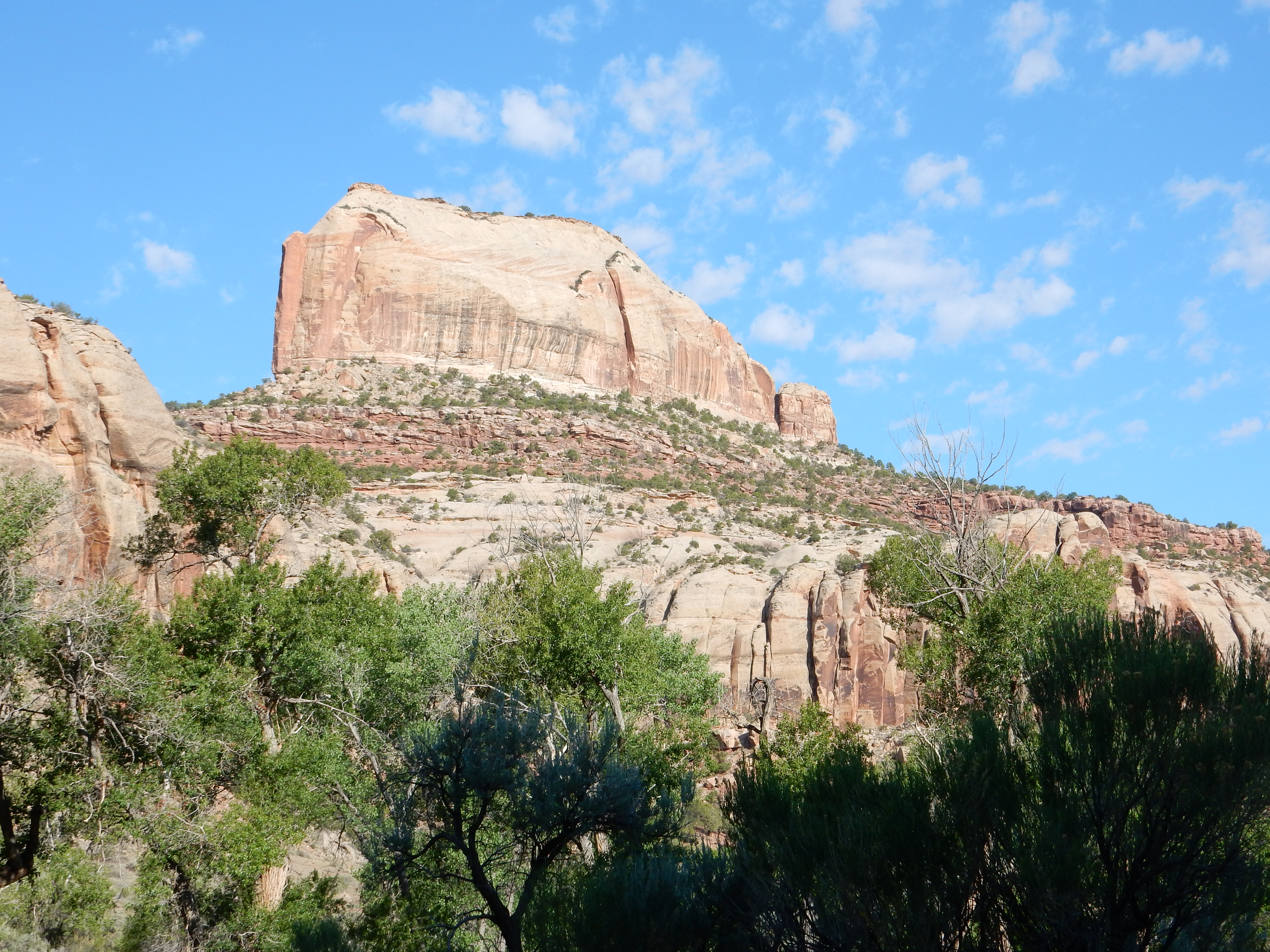
- Glen Canyon Group in southeast Utah. At top are massive beds of Navajo Sandstone separated by thinner beds of the Kayenta Formation from massive beds at bottom of the Wingate Sandstone.
- Type: Group
- Sub-units: (oldest to youngest) Wingate Sandstone, Moenave Formation, Kayenta Formation, Navajo Sandstone
- Underlies: San Rafael Group
- Overlies: Chinle Formation

Location
- Coordinates: 36.938°N 111.483°W
- Region: Four Corners
- Country: United States

Type section
- Named for: Glen Canyon
- Named by: Gregory and Moore
- Glen Canyon Group (the United States) Glen Canyon Group (Arizona)

The Glen Canyon Group is a geologic group of formations that is spread across the U.S. states of Nevada, Utah, northern Arizona, north west New Mexico and western Colorado. It is called the Glen Canyon Sandstone in the Green River Basin of Colorado and Utah.

There are four formations within the group. From oldest to youngest, these are the Wingate Sandstone, Moenave Formation, Kayenta Formation, and Navajo Sandstone. Part of the Colorado Plateau and the Basin and Range, this group of formations was laid down during the Late Triassic and Early Jurassic, with the Triassic-Jurassic boundary within the Wingate Sandstone. The top of the Glen Canyon Group is thought to date to the Toarcian stage of the Early Jurassic.

Asterisks (*) below indicate usage by the U.S. Geological Survey.

== Description ==
The Glen Canyon Group consists of extensive eolian deposits of latest Triassic to Early Jurassic age on the Colorado Plateau. These form the spectacular orange canyon walls of Canyonlands National Park and Paria Canyon as well as the unflooded portions of Glen Canyon. Deposition of the Glen Canyon Group ceased in the Middle Jurassic with the transgression of the Sundance Sea, which separated deposition of the Glen Canyon Group from deposition of the overlying San Rafael Group. The Glen Canyon Group is separated from the underlying Chinle Formation by the regional J-0 unconformity, which represents a time of widespread erosion across western North America. The group is likewise separated from the overlying San Rafael Group by the regional J-2 conformity, representing a renewal of widespread erosion.

The Glen Canyon Group was deposited in a foreland basin created by the uplift of the Sevier Mountains in what is now Nevada and eastern Utah. As a result, the formations of the group thicken to the west.

The Kayenta Formation pinches out and disappears to the north, in the Uintah Basin, and the Wingate Sandstone and Navajo Sandstone become indistinguishable. These remaining eolian beds have sometimes been mapped as simply Glen Canyon Formation, but they correlate with the Nugget Sandstone further north, and it has been recommended that they be assigned to the Nugget Sandstone.

== Subunits ==
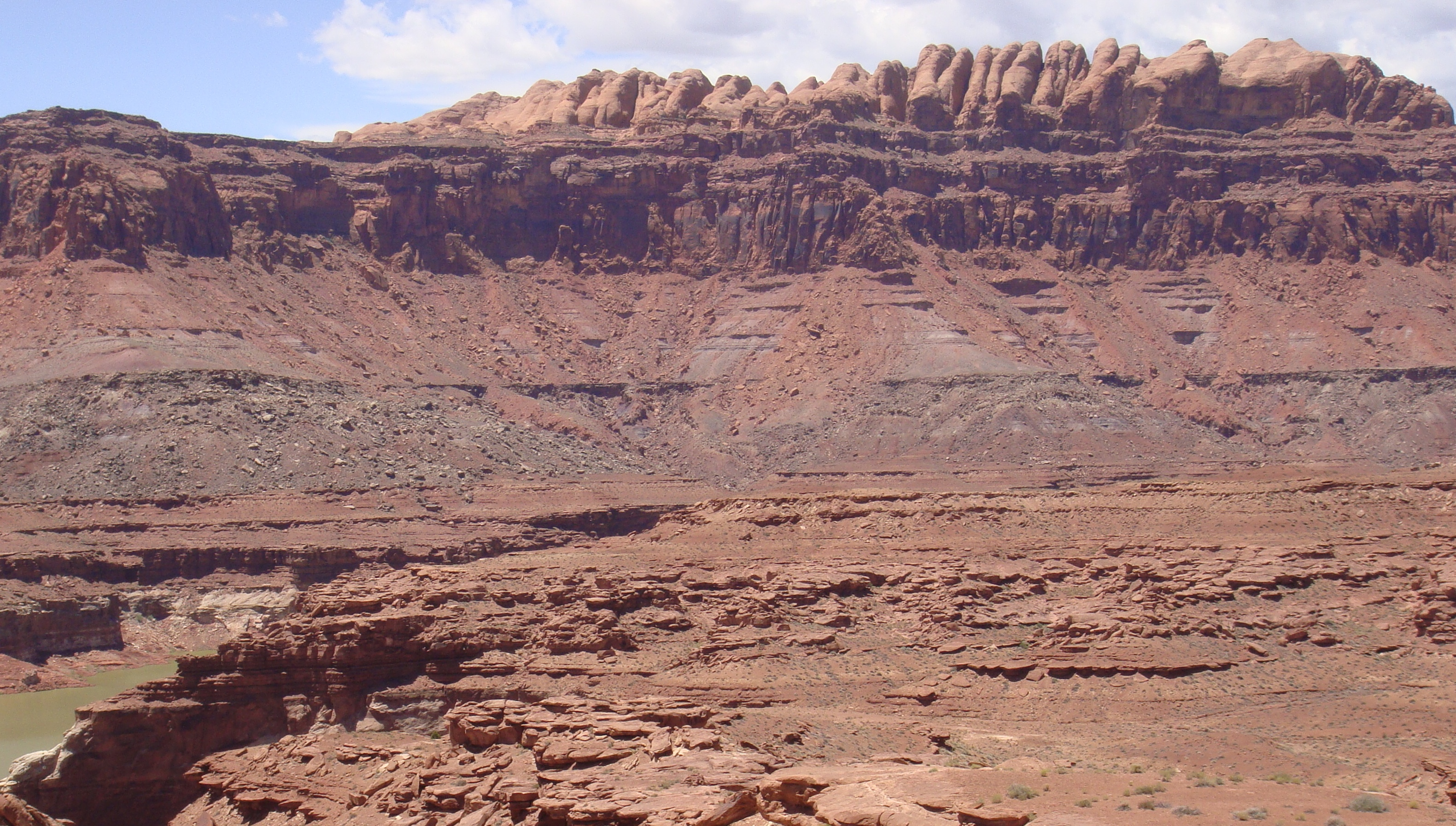
The Permian through Jurassic stratigraphy of the Colorado Plateau area of southeastern Utah that makes up much of the famous prominent rock formations in protected areas such as Capitol Reef National Park and Canyonlands National Park. From top to bottom: Rounded tan domes of the Navajo Sandstone, layered red Kayenta Formation, cliff-forming, vertically-jointed, red Wingate Sandstone, slope-forming, purplish Chinle Formation, layered, lighter-red Moenkopi Formation, and white, layered Cutler Formation sandstone. Picture from Glen Canyon National Recreation Area, Utah.

Group rank (stratigraphic order):

- Navajo Sandstone (AZ*, CO*, NM*, UT*),
- Kayenta Formation (AZ, CO*, UT*),
- Moenave Formation (AZ*, NV*, UT*),
- Wingate Sandstone (AZ*, CO*, NM*, UT*)

== History of investigation ==
There is no designated type locality for this group. It was named by Gregory and Moore prior to 1928 for exposures in walls that form the Glen Canyon of the Colorado River in Coconino County, Arizona and San Juan County, Utah, though their report was not published until 1931. The name had by then been published by Gilluly and Reeside, who gave an overview of the group.

In 1936, A.A. Baker reexamined the group and named the Kayenta Formation. The work was revised again in 1955 by Averitt and others. They assigned the Shurtz Sandstone Tongue (new) and Lamb Point Tongue (new) to the Navajo Sandstone, and Cedar City Tongue (new) and Tenney Canyon Tongue (new) to the Kayenta Formation. In 1957 Harshbarger and others created an overview and revision that assigned the Moenave Formation and divided the Wingate Sandstone into the newly named Rock Point and Lukachukai members. In 1963, the upper contact was revised by Phoenix, who moved the uppermost silstone beds of the Navajo Sandstone into the Judd Hollow Tongue of the Carmel Formation. Poole and Stewart mapped the group into the Green River Basin in 1964, treating it here as a single formation. Areal extent limits were revised by Wilson and Stewart in 1967 and again by Green in 1974, who added the Iyanbito Member. Peterson and Pipiringos revised the upper contact and created an overview in 1979. In 1989 the age of the group was reexamined by Padian and separately by Dubiel (who also revised the lower contact).

== Places found ==
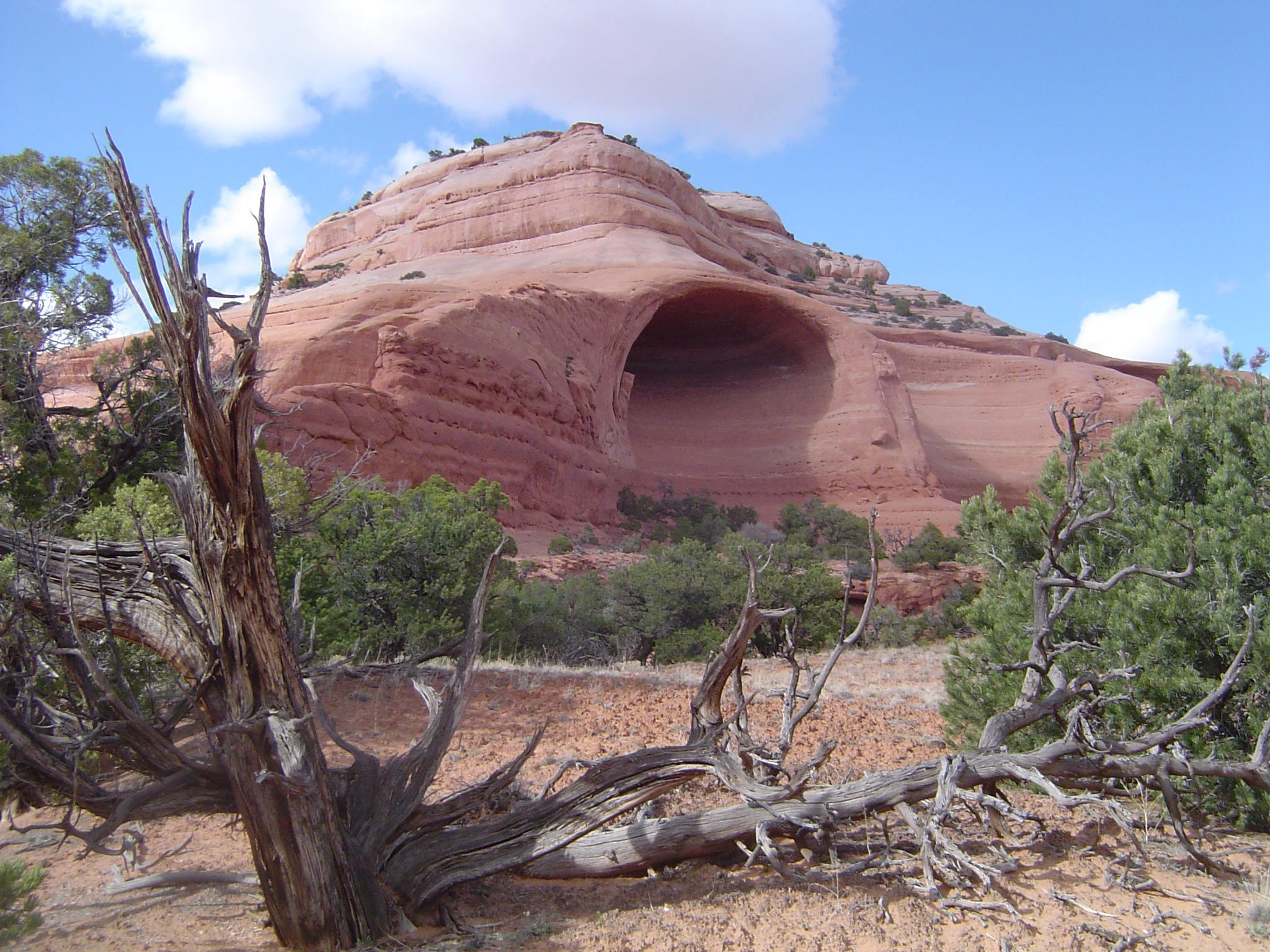
Alcove in the Navajo Sandstone near Moab, Utah.

Geologic Province:

- Black Mesa Basin
- Great Basin province
- Green River Basin
- Paradox Basin
- Piceance Basin
- Plateau Sedimentary Province
- San Juan Basin
- Uinta Uplift

== Paleontology ==
Prehistoric animals from the various formations of the Glen Canyon Group include several types of dinosaurs, known from both skeletal remains and tracks. Dinosaur finds in the Wingate and Moenave formations are presently almost entirely tracks. The Kayenta Formation has a diverse skeletal fauna including the theropods "Syntarsus" kayentakatae and Dilophosaurus, the prosauropod Sarahsaurus, an unnamed heterodontosaurid, and the armored dinosaurs Scelidosaurus and Scutellosaurus. The Navajo Sandstone has body fossils of the theropod Segisaurus and an Ammosaurus-like prosauropod, and tracks.

The following summarizes vertebrate fossils and tracks reported in the Glen Canyon Group:

Navajo Sandstone:

Body fossils

Tritylodontidae indet.
Protosuchidae indet.
Segisaurus hallii Camp
Ammosaurus

Trace fossils

Actinopterygii
Anchisauripus
Anomoepus?
Brasilichnium
Eubrontes
Grallator
Tetrasauropus
Otozoum
Anomoepus

Kayenta Formation:

Body fossils

Hybodontidae incert.
Osteichthyes incert.
Prosalirus bitis Shubin and Jenkins
Eocaecilia micropodia Jenkins and Wash
Kayentachelys aprix Gaffney et al.
’’Sarahsaurus’’
’’Dilophosaurus’’
’’Kayentavenator’’
’’Scelidosaurus’’
’’Scutellosaurus’’
Unnamed Heterodontosaur

Trace fossils

Brasilichnium?
Eubrontes
Grallator
Otozoum

Moenave Formation:

Body fossils

Semionotidae incert.
Reptilia indet.
Protosuchus
Lepidosauria indet.
Megapnosaurus

Trace fossils

Brasilichnium
Grallator
Tetrasauropus
Eubrontes

Wingate Sandstone:

Trace fossils:

Brasilichnium
Tetrasauropus
Grallator

== See also ==
- Lists of dinosaur-bearing stratigraphic units
- List of stratigraphic units with few dinosaur genera
