= Juab Limestone =

Geologic formation in Utah, United States

- Stratigraphic range: Ordovician
- Type: Formation
- Underlies: Kanosh Formation

Lithology
- Primary: Limestone

Location
- Region: Utah, Nevada
- Country: United States

The Juab Limestone is a geologic formation in Utah, USA. It preserves fossils dating back to the Ordovician period.

== See also ==
- List of fossiliferous stratigraphic units in Utah
- Paleontology in Utah
