= Fenestella =

Roman historian and encyclopaedic writer

Fenestella (c. 52 BC – c. AD 19) was a Roman historian and encyclopaedic writer.

== Biography ==
He flourished in the reign of Tiberius. According to Jerome, he lived from 52 BC to AD 19 (according to others 35 BC – AD 36).

== Work ==
Taking Varro for his model, Fenestella was one of the chief representatives of the new style of historical writing which, in the place of the brilliant descriptive pictures of Livy, discussed curious and out-of-the-way incidents and customs of political and social life, including literary history. He was the author of a work entitled Annales, probably from the earliest times down to his own days.

The fragments indicate the great variety of subjects discussed: the origin of the appeal to the people (provocatio); the use of elephants in the circus games; the wearing of gold rings; the introduction of the olive tree; the material for making the toga; the cultivation of the soil; certain details as to the lives of Cicero and Terence.

The work was referred to (mention is made of an abridged edition) by Pliny the Elder, Asconius Pedianus (the commentator on Cicero), Nonius and the philologists. Fragments of his work can be found in Hermann Peter's Historicorum Romanorum fragmenta (1883).

A work published under the name of L. Fenestella (De magistratibus et sacerdotiis Romanorum, 1510) is really by A. D. Fiocchi, canon and papal secretary, and was subsequently published as by him (under the Latinized form of his name, Floccus), edited by Aegidius Witsius (1561).
