= List of fossiliferous stratigraphic units in Nevada =

This article contains a list of fossil-bearing stratigraphic units in the state of Nevada, U.S.

== Sites ==
Group or Formation	Period	Notes
Al Rose Formation	Ordovician	
Aldrich Station Formation	Neogene	
Antelope Valley Formation	Ordovician	
Antler Peak Formation	Permian	
Arcturus Formation	Permian	
Arcturus Group/Loray Formation	Permian	
Augusta Mountain Formation	Triassic	
Badger Flat Formation	Ordovician	
Banner Formation	Carboniferous	
Barrel Springs Formation	Ordovician	
Bird Spring Formation	Permian, Carboniferous	
Bird Spring Group/Indian Springs Formation	Carboniferous	
Bonanza King Formation	Cambrian	
Buckskin Mountain Formation	Permian	
Buffalo Canyon Formation	Neogene	
Caesar Canyon Limestone	Ordovician	
Campito Formation	Cambrian	
Candelaria Formation	Triassic	
Carlin Formation	Neogene	
Carrara Formation	Cambrian	
Chainman Formation	Carboniferous	
Chainman Shale	Carboniferous	
Chisholm Shale	Cambrian	
Chloropagus Formation	Neogene	
Coal Valley Formation	Neogene	
Coils Creek Limestone	Devonian	
Copenhagen Formation	Ordovician	
Corset Spring Shale	Cambrian	
Davis Spring Formation	Carboniferous	
Deep Spring Formation	Cambrian	
Denay Limestone	Devonian	
Desert Peak Formation	Neogene	
Devils Gate Limestone	Devonian	
Diamond Peak Formation	Carboniferous	
Dinwoody Formation	Triassic	
Dry Canyon Formation	Triassic	
Dun Glen Formation	Triassic	
Dunderberg Shale	Cambrian	
Dunlap Formation	Jurassic	
Elko Formation	Paleogene	
Elko Shales Formation	Neogene	
Ely Limestone	Carboniferous	
Ely Springs Dolomite	Ordovician	
Ely Group/Moleen Formation	Carboniferous	
Emigrant Springs Formation	Cambrian	
Esmeralda Formation	Neogene	
Eureka Quartzite	Ordovician	
Excelsior Formation	Triassic	
Favret Formation	Triassic	
Ferguson Mountain Formation	Permian	
Fish Haven Dolomite	Ordovician	
Gabbs Formation	Jurassic, Triassic	
Goodwin Limestone	Ordovician	
Goughs Canyon Formation	Carboniferous	
Grantsville Formation	Triassic	
Guilmette Formation	Devonian	
Hales Limestone	Cambrian	
Hamburg Formation	Cambrian	
Hanson Creek Formation	Ordovician	
Happy Creek Formation	Permian	
Harkless Formation	Cambrian	
Hay Ranch Formation	Neogene	
Horse Spring Formation	Neogene	
Hosselkus Formation	Triassic	
Hoyt Canyon Formation	Triassic	
Humboldt Formation	Neogene	
Indian Springs Formation	Carboniferous	
Inskip Formation	Carboniferous	
Joana Limestone	Carboniferous	
Johns Wash Limestone	Cambrian	
Johnson Spring Formation	Ordovician	
Kaibab Limestone	Permian	
Kanosh Formation	Ordovician	
Kanosh Formation	Ordovician	
Laketown Dolomite	Silurian	
Lehman Formation	Ordovician	
Lincoln Peak Formation	Cambrian	
Lone Mountain Dolomite	Silurian	
Loray Formation	Permian	
Nevada Group/McColley Canyon Formation	Devonian	
Pogonip Group/Yellow Hill Limestone	Ordovician	
Luning Formation	Triassic	
McColley Canyon Formation	Devonian	
McMonnigal Limestone	Devonian	
Middlegate Formation	Neogene	
Moenkopi Formation	Triassic	
Monarch Mill Formation	Neogene	
Muddy Creek Formation	Neogene	
Mule Spring Limestone	Cambrian	
Murdock Mountain Formation	Permian	
Nevada Group/Denay Limestone	Devonian	
Ninemile Formation	Ordovician	
Ninemile Shale	Ordovician	
Ninemile Group/Lower Antelope Valley Formation	Ordovician	
Nopah Formation	Cambrian	
Opd Unit Formation	Ordovician	
Osobb Formation	Triassic	
Panaca Formation	Neogene	
Park City Group/Gerster Formation	Permian	
Park City Group/Plympton Formation	Permian	
Pequop Formation	Permian	
Perkins Canyon Formation	Ordovician	
Phosphoria Formation	Permian	
Pioche Formation	Cambrian	
Pioche Shale	Cambrian	
Pit Formation	Triassic	
Piute Formation	Devonian	
Pogonip Group/Antelope Valley Formation	Ordovician	
Pogonip Group/Antelope Valley Limestone	Ordovician	
Pogonip Group/Copenhagen Formation	Ordovician	
Pogonip Group/Goodwin Formation	Ordovician	
Pogonip Group/Shingle Limestone	Ordovician	
Poleta Formation	Cambrian	
Portuguese Springs Formation	Permian	
Preble Formation	Cambrian	
Prida Formation	Triassic	
Pyramid Formation	Neogene	
Quinn River Formation	Permian	
Rabbit Hill Limestone	Devonian	
Raiff Limestone	Cambrian	
Raine Ranch Formation	Neogene	
Rib Hill Formation	Permian	
Riepe Spring Formation	Permian, Carboniferous	
Riepetown Formation	Permian	
Roberts Mountains Formation	Devonian, Silurian	
Schoonover Formation	Permian	
Scott Canyon Formation	Cambrian	
Secret Canyon Formation	Cambrian	
Shafter Formation	Cambrian	
Sheep Pass Formation	Paleogene	
Shingle Pass Limestone	Ordovician	
Star Peak Formation	Triassic	
Star Peak Group/Augusta Formation	Triassic	
Star Peak Group/Favret Formation	Triassic	
Star Peak Group/Priada Formation	Triassic	
Star Peak Group/Prida Formation	Triassic	
Sterling Quartzite Formation	Ediacaran	
Sultan Formation	Devonian	
Sunflower Formation	Permian	
Sunrise Formation	Jurassic	
Swan Peak Formation	Ordovician	
Swarbrick Formation	Cambrian	
Telegraph Canyon Formation	Devonian	
Thaynes Formation	Triassic	
Thaynes Limestone	Triassic	
Tor Limestone	Devonian	
Toroweap Formation	Permian	
Truckee Formation	Neogene	
Tybo Shale	Cambrian	
Valmy Group/Jacks Peak Formation	Ordovician	
Vinini Formation	Ordovician	
Virgin Valley Formation	Neogene	
Weber Formation	Cretaceous	
West Range Limestone	Devonian	
Whipple Cave Formation	Cambrian	
White Narrows Formation	United States	
White Pine Shale	Carboniferous	
Windfall Formation	Ordovician, Cambrian	
Windmill Limestone	Devonian	
Winnemucca Formation	Triassic	
Wood Canyon Formation	Ediacaran	
Yellow Hill Formation	Ordovician	

== See also ==
- Paleontology in Nevada
