= Fossil Hill Member =

Triassic geologic unit

- Stratigraphic range: Anisian
- Type: Geological member
- Unit of: Prida Formation, Favret Formation

Lithology
- Primary: Calcareous Shale
- Other: Limestone

Location
- Region: Nevada
- Country: United States

Type section
- Named by: Kathryn Nichols and Norman Silberling

The Fossil Hill Member is a Middle Triassic-aged rock unit. The Fossil Hill unit occurs as a member of both the Prida and Favret formations. It outcrops in multiple locations across Northwestern Nevada including the western Humboldt Range, Tobin Range, Augusta Mountains, and China Mountain. Calcareous shale, mudstone, and black limestones are the most common lithologies present within the unit. The member was named for Fossil Hill, Nevada, a locality within the Humboldt Mountains where large quantities of Anisian-aged marine fossils were discovered in the early 20th century. Fossils are common throughout the Fossil Hill, and the unit is well known for preserving the remains of some of the earliest marine reptiles, including several genera of ichthyosaurs and a pistosaur. Other fossils include bony fish, hybodont sharks, and invertebrates with ceratitid ammonoids being especially abundant.

== History ==
The Fossil Hill Member was first recognized for its paleontological resources at the end of the 19th century. John Campbell Merriam and Eustace Furlong from the University of California Berkeley led the Saurian Expedition of 1905 to Fossil Hill in the Humboldt Mountains with the intention to search for Ichthyosaur fossils. The expedition was joined by the venerable heiress Annie Alexander who financed the expedition and provided most of the written documentation through journal entries and photographs. The expedition excavated the remains of 25 Triassic Ichthyosaurs, many of which were collected and shipped back to Berkeley. These skeletons, along with those collected from subsequent expeditions by UC Berkeley in the early 20th century, were the most complete Ichthyosaur specimens from North America at the time, and Merriam's study of these fossils provided some of the earliest knowledge on early ichthyosaur evolution.

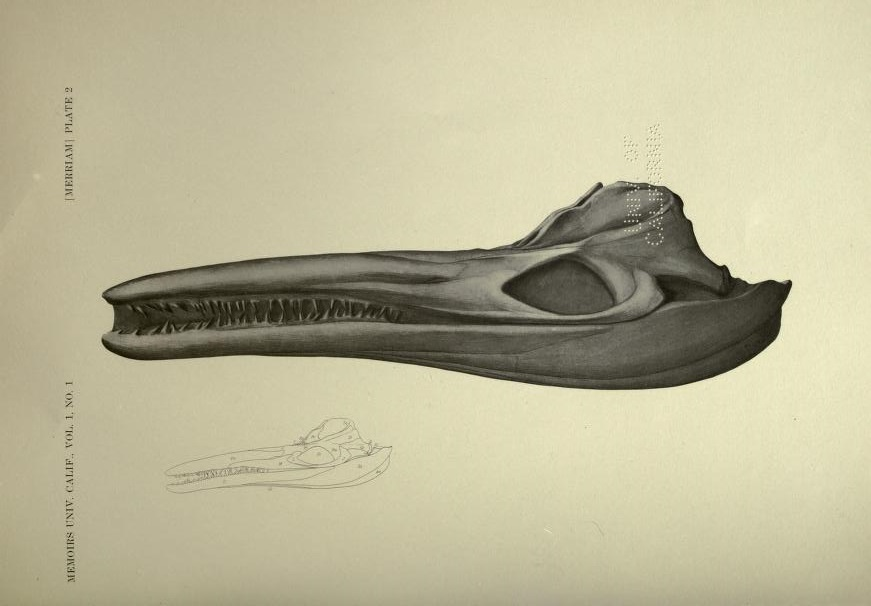
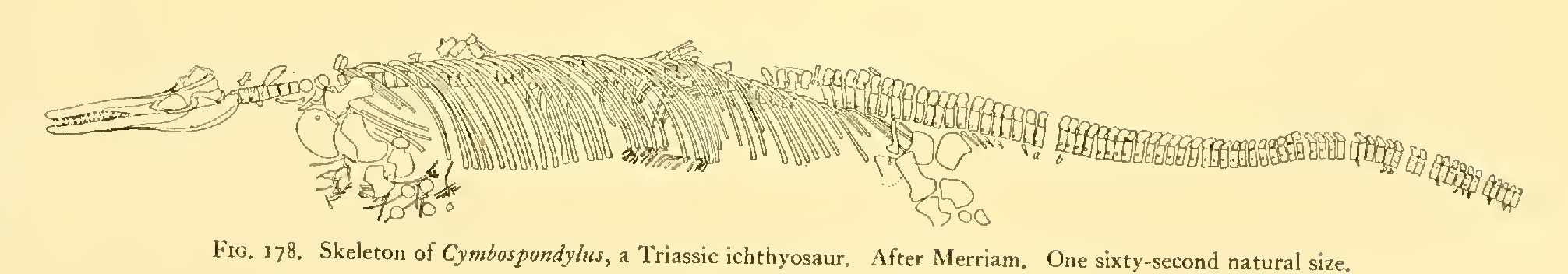
Sketches representing the skull and fossil skeleton of UCMP 9950, one of the specimens of C. petrinus having been discovered during expeditions led by the University of California at the beginning of the 20th century

In the latter half of the 20th century, the section of Fossil Hill Member outcropping in the Augusta Mountains was identified for its ammonoid record to be used in biostratigraphic definition and correlation of Triassic rocks. Field observations of vertebrate fossils in the Augusta Mountains drew the attention of paleontologist Martin Sander who has led numerous teams to collect marine reptile fossils including specimens representing 7 new species. Paleontological fieldwork and research in the Augusta Mountains is ongoing.

== Geology ==
=== Stratigraphy ===
The Favret Formation and the Prida Formation, constitute two of the recognized geological formations within the Star Peak Group, of Northwestern Nevada. The Fossil Hill member links these two formations.

Tectonic fragmentation of the region has broken apart most stratigraphic units of the Star Peak Group. Because of this outcrop discontinuity, the Fossil Hill Member is part of different formations in different parts of the outcrop area. In the Prida Formation, this member outcrops west of the Humboldt Range, and in the Favret Formation, it outcrops in the Augusta Mountains and southern extent of the Tobin Range. Although differing in precise age, the strata assigned to this member form a laterally uniform unit of offshore calcareous rocks. The various occurrences of the Fossil Hill member are also united by a distinct pelagic Anisian paleofauna preserved in the rocks.

The Fossil Hill varies in thickness throughout its outcrops. In the China Mountain and Tobin Range sections, erosion and dolomitization from overlying units have rendered the Fossil Hill usually thin or locally absent. The unit within the Prida Formation varies from 60 to 120 meters thick while the section in the Augusta Mountains exceeds 250 meters.

Silty shale is the prevailing lithology throughout the Fossil Hill Member outcropping in the Augusta Mountains with alternating facies of fissile shaley limestone and massive black limestones common throughout the entire section. Specific bioclastic beds dominated by Daonella fossils occur at multiple intervals within the shaley limestones. Compressed ammonoid fossils are also common. Three dimensionally preserved ammonoids occur less commonly but are still present in multiple areas. These three dimensional ammonoids are less prone to weathering and are useful for biostratigraphy.

== Paleobiota ==
The Fossil Hill Member preserves a marine fossil assemblage from the continental margin off the west coast of Pangaea. This Fossil Hill Biota contains both abundant invertebrates and one of the earliest marine reptile communities. The invertebrate record contains numerous fossils of cephalopods, especially ceratitid ammonoids. The prevalence of anoxic black shales and limestones, and the near absence of benthic fossils indicate a pelagic environment and a food chain unsupported by the benthos. Bony fish are present, but unusually rare, and the ecosystem was likely supported by an ammonoid-based foodweb. This is reflected in the inferred lifestyles of its marine reptile community, several of which show adaptations for feeding on shelled invertebrates.

The marine reptile assemblage of the Fossil Hill Biota is notable for being one of the earliest in the Mesozoic, and are thus among the first in a long evolutionary history of secondarily aquatic tetrapods. The marine reptiles of the Panthalassic Fossil Hill Biota are uniformly adapted to a fully marine lifestyle, and the assemblage lacks any clear coastal or shallow water adapted animals. The sole exception to this is the pseudosuchian Benggwigwishingasuchus, which shows no aquatic adaptations and was most likely a terrestrial animal that was washed out to sea and buried. The lack of semi-aquatic marine reptiles is in contrast with similarly-aged localities in Europe and China, which preserve communities from the Paleo-Tethys Sea. These other localities preserve diverse fossil communities of marine reptiles exhibiting varying degrees of adaptation to marine lifestyles. This clear trend in fully marine lifestyles exhibited by the Fossil Hill biota, combined with the Panthalassic geographic setting, supports the interpretation that the Fossil Hill fauna represents the first fully pelagic marine tetrapod assemblage, and offers a unique view into the ecology of Triassic Panthalassa.

=== Ichthyosauriforms ===
The marine reptile assemblage of the Fossil Hill Biota is overwhelmingly dominated by Ichthyosaurs. Ichthyosaurs were among the first marine reptile groups to radiate in the earliest Triassic and would continue to be a common representative of Mesozoic marine reptile fauna until their extinction in the beginning of the Late Cretaceous (90 mya). The Ichthyosaurs of the Fossil Hill Member are diverse in both size and morphology which support a variety of interpreted ecologies. Notably, large body size is common amongst the Fossil Hill Ichthyosaurs which makes them the first animals, terrestrial or marine, to attain body sizes in excess of several tons. In particular, the gigantic 17 meter (56 feet) long Cymbospondylus youngorum is the first giant preserved in the fossil record and has received substantial attention for its importance in the evolution of gigantism in animals. The genus Cymbospondylus itself contains several species described from the Fossil Hill Member. The coexistence of so many large sympatric species is uncommon, and indicates close temporal proximity to the evolutionary radiation of these ocean going reptiles.

Genus	Species	Material	Notes	Images
Cymbospondylus	C. petrinus	Multiple specimens of excellent quality from both the Favret and Prida Formations including UCMP 9950, a near-complete specimen from Fossil Hill.	A large cymbospondylid ichthyosaur varying in size from 8–12 metres (26–39 ft).	Life restoration of C. petrinus
Cymbospondylus	C. nichollsi	FMNH PR2251, from the Favret Formation, consists of the back half of a skull, the first 28 vertebrae, several ribs, and part of the shoulder girdle	Mid-sized species of Cymbospondylus, estimated to be about 7.6 metres (25 ft) long	The holotype of C. nichollsi on display at the Field Museum
Cymbospondylus	C. duelferi	LACM DI 158109 consists of a nearly complete skull with articulated and disarticulated post cranial material. Diminutive strings of articulated fetal vertebrae in the trunk.	The smallest species of the genus at 4.3 metres (14 ft) long, holotype is among the earliest examples of viviparity	Skull of the holotype of C. duelfiri
Cymbospondylus	C. youngorum	LACM DI 157871, consists of a large complete skull, some cervical vertebrae, the right humerus as well as fragments of the shoulder girdle.	A giant, 17 metres (56 ft) long ichthyosaur; the largest animal known up to this point in time	The skull of C. youngorum on display
Omphalosaurus	O. nevadanus	Multiple specimens from both the Fossil Hill locality and the Favret formation.	A medium-sized, basal ichthyosauriform with dental batteries of button shaped teeth and a presumed ammonoid feeder	An illustration of the O. nevadanus holotype
Phalarodon	P. fraasi	Multiple specimens from the Fossil Hill and Augusta Mountain localities	A small, 1 metre (3.3 ft) long mixosaur	A 3D model of a skull assigned to P. fraasi
Phalarodon	P. callowayi		Holotype found in the same beds as Augustasaurus	Life restoration of Phalarodon
Thalattoarchon	T. saurophagis	FMNH PR 3032, consists of a major part of the skull and the axial skeleton, including parts of the pelvic girdle and rear flippers	A large ichthyosaur with large, laterally compressed teeth, interpreted as a macropredator	Life restoration and size comparison of a T. saurophagis with a human

=== Sauropterygians ===
A partial femur attributed to a eusauropterygian (possibly Corosaurus) and an interclavicle putatively attributed to a thalattosaur have been uncovered from outcroppings of the Fossil Hill Member in the Favret Formation.

Genus	Species	Material	Notes	Images
Augustasaurus	A. hagdorni	Single specimen. FMNH PR 1974 is a partial articulated skeleton containing the posterior neck, trunk, shoulder girdle, and both forelimbs and a disassociated skull,	A pistosauroid from the Favret Formation	Two Augustasaurus hagdorni

=== Pseudosuchians ===
Genus	Species	Material	Notes	Images
Benggwigwishingasuchus	B. eremicarminis	A single, mostly complete skeleton (LACM-DI 158616)	A poposauroid pseudosuchian from the Favret Formation, specimen was probably a terrestrial animal washed out to sea	Photos and diagrams of the holotype

=== Actinopterygians ===
Various bones including opercular remains, jaw fragments, and scales have been found that are not attributable to any specific taxon.

Genus	Species	Material	Notes	Images
Saurichthys	S. spp.	FMNH PR 1800, parts of a relatively large upper and lower jaw; FMNH PR 1801, a mostly complete skull roof and an operculum	May represent 1 or 2 undescribed species of Saurichthys	A model of another species of Saurichthys in Germany

=== Chondrichthyans ===
Genus	Species	Material	Notes	Images
Acrodus	A. cuneocostatus	A complete tooth (the holotype, FMNH PF 14857) with 27 teeth of varying completeness	An acrodontid hybodontiform	
Acrodus	A. cf. oreodontus	Several teeth	Referred to A. oreodontus, but not confidently	
Acrodus	A. spitzbergensis	Eight teeth		
Acrodus	A. cf. vermicularis	Teeth	Distinct from A. spitzbergensis, but possibly indeterminate	
Hybodus	H. sp.	Five damaged teeth	Not referrable to any of the named species of Hybodus	H. hauffianus (a related species) showing the sexual dimorphism known in hybodonts
Mucrovenator	M. minimus	22 teeth, including the holotype (FMNH PF 15020)	A synechodontiform euselachian	
Palaeobates	P. cf. shastaensis	Several fragmentary teeth	Previously assigned to the genus Strophodus	
Palaeobates	P. sp.	Four fragmentary teeth	A polyacrodontid hybodontiform, too incomplete to assign to any of the named species of Palaeobates	
Palaeospinax	P. sp.		A synechodontiform shark with teeth superficially similar to Hybodus	
Polyacrodus	P. bucheri	One incomplete tooth (the holotype, FMNH PF 14969) and 14 other teeth of varying completness		
Polyacrodus	P. tregoi	31 teeth, none of them fully complete		

=== Molluscs ===
Ammonites

- Acrochordiceras
  - A. carolinae
  - A. hatschekii
  - A. hyatti
- Alanites
  - A. mulleri
  - A. obesus
- Anagymnotoceras spivaki
- Aplococeras
  - A. parvus
  - A. smithi
  - A. vogdesi
- Atractites
  - A. clavatulus
  - A. solidus
  - A. "sp. A"
  - A. "sp. B"
  - A. "sp. C"
- Augustaceras
  - A. escheri
  - A. staffordi
- Brackites vogdesi
- Calliconites nevadensis
- Caucasites nicholsi
- Constrigymnites robertsi
- Discoptychites sp.
- Eogymnotoceras thompsoni
- Epigymnites alexandrae
- Eutomoceras
  - E. dalli
  - E. dunni
  - E. lahontanum
  - E. laubei
- Frechites
  - F. nevadanus
  - F. occidentalis
- Grambergia sp.
- Groenlandites
  - G. merriami
  - G. pridaense
- Gymnites
  - G. billingsi
  - G. perplanus
- Gymnotoceras
  - G. blakei
  - G. rotelliformis
- Hollandites congressensis
- Humboldtites septentrionalis
- Intornites
  - I. mctaggarti
  - I. nevadanus
- Isculites tozeri
- Japonites
  - J. surgriva
  - J. welteri
- Kocaelia sp.
- Leiophyllites sp.
- Longobardites
  - L. parvus
  - L. zsigmondyi
- Metadagnoceras youngi
- Metadinarites desertorus
- Nevadisculites
  - N. smithi
  - N. taylori
- Nevadites
  - N. humboldtensis
  - N. hyatti
- Nicholsites tozeri
- Paracrochordiceras
  - P. americanum
  - P. mclearni
  - P. plicatus
  - P. silberlingsi
  - P. sp.
- Paradanubites crassicostatus
- Parafrechites meeki
- Paranevadites
  - P. furlongi
  - P. gabbi
- Platycuccoceras
  - P. bonaevistae
  - P. favretense
- Proarcestes
  - P. balfouri
  - P. gabbi
- Pseudodanubites nicholsi
- Pseudokeyserlingites guexi
- Ptychites sp.
- Sageceras walteri
- Silberlingites
  - S. cricki
  - S. mulleri
  - S. tregoi
- Silberlingitoides
  - S. clarkei
  - S. cricki
- Stenopopanoceras sp.
- Sturia japonica
- Thanamites contractus
- Tozerites
  - T. gemmellaroi
  - T. humboldtensis
  - T. polygyratus
- Trematoceras elegans
- Tropigastrites
  - T. lahontanus
  - T. louderbacki
- Tropigymnites planorbis
- Ussurites
  - U. arthaberi
  - U. detwilleri
  - U. sp.

Bivalves

- Daonella
  - D. americana
  - D. dubia
  - D. moussoni
  - D. sturi

Nautiloids

- Aulametacoceras humboldtensis
- Germanonautilus furlongi
- Grypoceras whitneyi
- Paranautilus smithi

== See also ==
- List of fossiliferous stratigraphic units in Nevada
