= Thalattoarchon =

Thalattoarchon Temporal range: Middle Triassic, Late Anisian, 244.6–242 Ma
- Holotype's skull (FMNH PR 3032)

Scientific classification
- Kingdom: Animalia
- Phylum: Chordata
- Class: Reptilia
- Order: †Ichthyosauria
- Node: †Merriamosauria
- Genus: †Thalattoarchon; Fröbisch et al., 2013

Type species
- †Thalattoarchon saurophagis Fröbisch et al., 2013

Extinct genus of reptiles

Thalattoarchon is a genus of large, Middle Triassic predatory ichthyosaurs from North America, containing the single species T. saurophagis. The taxon was described in 2013 from a single partial skeleton discovered in Nevada. The generic name, meaning "ruler of the seas", refers to its status as an apex predator, while the specific epithet, meaning "lizard eater", alludes to its carnivorous diet. As an ichthyosaur, Thalattoarchon had flippers for limbs and a fin on the tail. It was a large ichthyosaur, with an estimated length of between 8 and 9 meters (26 and 30 ft). The animal had a long, slender body but with a proportionally large head and a straight, elongated tail. The jaws of Thalattoarchon feature large teeth with two cutting edges of up to 12 centimeters (4.7 in). Although the fossils are incomplete, the animal would have had a skeleton comprising at least 60 presacral vertebrae.

The classification of this genus within the ichthyosaurs is much debated, being either classified within the clade Merriamosauria or in the more basal family Cymbospondylidae. As its scientific name indicates, its sharp, cutting teeth suggest that it could easily have preyed upon other marine reptiles of its time, indicating that it most likely occupied the highest position in the food chain. Its behavior as an apex predator is sometimes compared to that of orcas, which have a similar lifestyle. Thalattoarchon is known from the Favret Formation, which during the Anisian represented a coastal oceanic region inhabited by a wide variety of aquatic life, including numerous other ichthyosaurs. The different ichthyosaurs in this area likely adopted distinct feeding strategies to avoid competition.

== Discovery and naming ==
The only specimen of Thalattoarchon was discovered in 1997 by the paleontologist Jim Holstein during a field expedition in the Augusta Mountains, located in Nevada, United States. It was with the support and a grant from the National Geographic Society that the fossils were completely exhumed in 2008, (Note: For an unclear reason, some sources list the year of discovery of the fossil specimen as 2010.) after a period of work of three weeks. The recovered material was transported by a helicopter and a truck out of the field. The fossils were excavated in the Taylori Zone of the Fossil Hill Member in the Favret Formation, dating to approximately 244.6 million years ago, from the beginning of the late Anisian of the Middle Triassic. The specimen, cataloged as FMNH PR 3032, consists of a major part of the skull and the axial skeleton, including parts of the pelvic girdle and rear flippers. It was in 2013 that this specimen was designated as the holotype of a new genus and species of ichthyosaurs by Nadia B. Fröbisch, Jörg Fröbisch, P. Martin Sander, Lars Schmitz and Olivier Rieppel, under the name of Thalattoarchon saurophagis in the scientific journal Proceedings of the National Academy of Sciences. The genus name comes from Ancient Greek θάλαττα (thálatta, "sea"), and ἄρχον (árchon, "ruler"), all meaning "ruler of the seas", directly referencing the animal's imposing size and position as an apex predator of the Triassic seas. The specific name also comes from Ancient Greek and is derived from the words σαῦρος (saûros, "lizard") and φᾰγεῖν (phageîn, "to eat"), meaning "lizard-eater", in reference to its carnivorous diet.

== Description ==
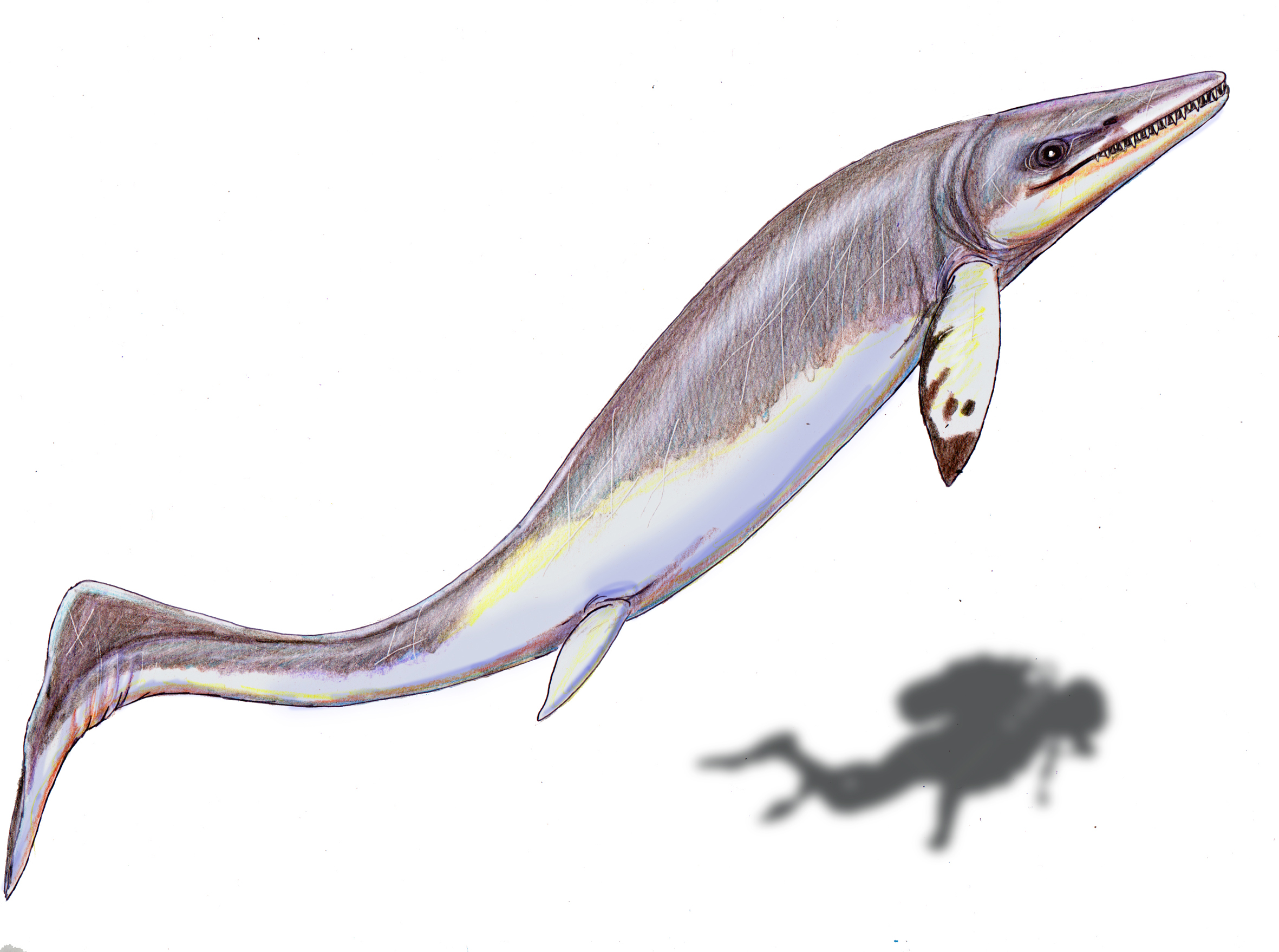
Life restoration

The describing team estimated the size of Thalattoarchon at over 8.6 meters (28 ft) long, making it a particularly large ichthyosaur. Its size and morphology are similar to some species of the contemporary genus Cymbospondylus. However, due to some missing parts of the holotype specimen, the authors mentioned that the estimate could be revised when more is known about the animal. In 2021, Paul Martin Sander and colleagues proposed that the animal would reach a body mass of 4.3 metric tons (4.7 short tons). In a 2023 book, Darren Naish slightly increased the estimated length of the animal, bringing it to 9 meters (30 ft). Like all other ichthyosaurs, Thalattoarchon has four flippers, but unlike the more derived (advanced-diverging) representatives dating from the Jurassic and Cretaceous, it has a long, poorly developed caudal fin, unlike the two caudal lobes present in later ichthyosaurs. The animal's head is remarkably large in proportion to its body, a trait rarely observed in representatives of the group. The size of the skull is estimated at 1.2 meters (3.9 ft) long. The skull of Thalattoarchon is proportionally shorter but more robust than those of other ichthyosaurs.

=== Skull ===
The skull of the only specimen of Thalattoarchon is partially preserved, missing the entire rostrum and the front of the mandible. The rest is still well preserved and allows it to be viewed as a whole. The eye sockets are elongated, reaching up to 29 cm (11 in), and each contain a scleral ring. The superior temporal fenestrae are large and oval, sharing a similar shape to those of Shastasaurus. The maxillae extend well below the eye sockets and carry large teeth all the way to their posterior ends. The nasal bones are very extensive and come into contact with the postorbital bones, but do not extend as far as the superior temporal fenestrae. The frontal bones are smaller, forming the anteromedial edge of the superior temporal fenestrae and surrounding the pineal foramen. In front of the pineal foramen there is a small sagittal crest that takes on the shape of a large plate further back. The parietal bones are smaller than the frontal bones and medially form the superior temporal fenestrae. The lacrimal bones and jugal bones are narrow and slender in shape.

The palate, although partially preserved, appears to be dominated by the large pterygoid bones. In the lower jaw, the dentary bone extends to the level of the maxillae but apparently lacks teeth on its rearmost part. This means that at least the fifth or sixth tooth in the maxillae would be missing a facing tooth in the mandible. The surangular has a distinct coronoid process located posterior to the eye sockets. Although the only known teeth of Thalattoarchon are located at the posterior level of the maxillae, it is possible that their size would increase towards the middle of the jaws. This morphological trend is also observed in many ichthyosaurs and other now extinct marine reptiles, such as mosasaurs, thalattosuchians and pliosaurs. The largest preserved tooth is at least 12 cm (4.7 in) long, with the crown alone measuring 5 cm (2.0 in). The teeth represent one of the main autapomorphies of Thalattoarchon, being large and thin, having two sharp edges each and a fairly smooth crown. The related genus Himalayasaurus has very similar dentition, but the latter differs from Thalattoarchon by the presence of longitudinal grooves on the crown.

=== Postcranial skeleton ===
Although the total number of vertebrae is not known in the animal, it is estimated that it would have had at least 60 in the presacral column. The anterior dorsal vertebrae are almost round in anteroposterior view and measure 10 cm (3.9 in) in diameter and 6 cm (2.4 in) long. This latter measurement remains constant throughout the presacral column as well as in the most anterior caudal vertebrae, except at the level of the middle dorsal vertebrae, which reach 12 cm (4.7 in) in diameter. The neural spines of the anterior dorsal vertebrae are larger than the vertebrae themselves, measuring 13–14 cm (5.1–5.5 in) tall, being flattened laterally, and not sharing spaces when viewed from the sides. The anterior dorsal vertebrae are associated with ribs having only a single head, unlike the double-headed ribs present in the cervical vertebrae. The posterior dorsal vertebrae are the same height and length as the middle dorsal vertebrae. However, the latter are characterized for having a flattened ventral surface and articular facets for the double-headed ribs, a trait also observed in some basal ichthyosaurs and in neoichthyosaurians dating from the Late Triassic to the Cretaceous. The caudal vertebrae of Thalattoarchon are laterally flattened and are twice as tall as they are wide, gradually decreasing in length. Large facets for the haemal arches, or chevrons, are present on the anterior caudal vertebrae. The animal's tail appears to be rather straight, having visibly no curvature and not having a turned-down end.

Few bones are preserved in the pelvic girdle and hind limbs, the only one fully preserved being the right ilium. The end of this bone participating in the hip socket is similar to that of Cymbospondylus, but its articulations with the sacral ribs may have been rather weak, as suggested by its pointed upper end. The femur is flattened and broad, having a slightly narrowed body and an enlarged distal end, being on the whole broader than that of Cymbospondylus. Another preserved bone is interpreted as a zeugopodial element (the part of a limb corresponding to either a forearm or a leg), but it is uncertain whether it is a tibia or a fibula. Regardless, it has a concave margin, enlarged ends, and is wider than long. The hind limbs and the pelvic girdle are proportionally small in relation to the body of the animal, with just the length of the femur being twice the height of the caudal vertebrae.

== Classification ==
In the phylogenetic analyses published by Fröbisch and colleagues in 2013, Thalattoarchon was classified as a basal representative of the Merriamosauria clade, being seen as more derived than Cymbospondylus and the Mixosauridae. Thalattoarchon was recovered either in an unresolved polytomy with Besanosaurus, Californosaurus, Toretocnemus, and other merriamosaurs or as more derived than the former three taxa but basal to the other merriamosaurs. However, in 2016, a phylogenetic revision carried out on the ichthyopterygians by Cheng Ji and his colleagues moved Thalattoarchon within the Cymbospondylidae, i.e. in a more basal position than the Merriamosauria as proposed three years earlier. This classification was generally accepted and retained in several phylogenetic analyses concerning ichthyosaurs published since. In a study published in 2017, Benjamin C. Moon presented various analyses that yielded different phylogenetic positions for Thalattoarchon. These positions varied, indicating that Thalattoarchon might be more closely related to later-evolving ichthyosaurs, situated earlier in the lineage than Cymbospondylus, or classified as the sister taxon to C. nichollsi. In 2021, Sander and his colleagues reclassified Thalattoarchon within the Merriamosauria, but this time as the sister taxon of the Shastasauridae.

The following cladogram shows the position of Thalattoarchon within the Ichthyosauromorpha after Sander et al. (2021):

- Ichthyosauromorpha
  - Hupehsuchus nanchangensis
  - - - Sclerocormus parviceps
      - Cartorhynchus lenticarpus
    - - Chaohusaurus chaoxianensis
      - - Chaohusaurus geishanensis
        - - Chaohusaurus zhangjiawanensis
          - - Utatsusaurus hataii
            - - Grippia longirostris
              - - Gulosaurus helmi
                - - Parvinatator wapitiensis
                  - - Xinminosaurus catactes
                    - - - Pessopteryx nisseri
                        - - Cymbospondylus buchseri
                          - - Cymbospondylus nichollsi
                            - - Cymbospondylus petrinus
                              - - Cymbospondylus duelferi
                                - Cymbospondylus youngorum
                      - - Mixosauridae
                        - - Phantomosaurus neubigi
                          - - Qianichthyosaurus zhoui
                            - - Qianichthyosaurus xingyiensis
                              - Wimanius odontopalatus
                          - Merriamosauria
                            - Besanosaurus leptorhynchus
                            - - - Thalattoarchon saurophagis
                                - Shastasauridae
                              - - - - Guizhouichthyosaurus tangae
                                    - Shonisaurus popularis
                                  - Euichthyosauria

== Paleobiology ==
Ichthyosaurs like Thalattoarchon were very well-adapted to their marine existence, spending their entire lives in the water and showing reduced levels of ossification of their bones. Nevertheless, ichthyosaurs still would have breathed air. Ichthyosaurs were active animals with high metabolic rates, able to maintain their body temperatures. The large eyes of ichthyosaurs indicate that vision would have been an important sense for them. Intermediate-grade ichthyosaurs likely used anguilliform (eel-like) or subcarangiform locomotion, swimming by undulating their entire body from side to side, owing to their long tails without strong bends and their long, flexible trunks. This differs from the more tail-driven locomotion presumed for the more spindle-shaped parvipelvians.

The morphology of Thalattoarchon suggests that it have been an apex predator similar to modern orcas.

=== Diet and feeding ===
Due to its bicarinate, cutting teeth and its large, robust head, Thalattoarchon is recognized as having been an apex predator. The abundant presence of marine reptiles within the Favret Formation suggests that the animal would have regularly attacked them. Its position as an apex predator is comparable to that of current orcas, because its cutting teeth would have been adapted to attack prey of considerable size, possibly even larger than Thalattoarchon itself, in the same way as killer whales. However, large ichthyosaurs like Cymbospondylus would not have been Thalattoarchon's primary target; the generally preferred prey would be medium-sized marine reptiles or juveniles instead. In 2021, Sander and his colleagues suggested that if Thalattoarchon would have fed on Cymbospondylus, it would have preyed on it using a pack-hunting strategy, a behavior that is not at all reported in the fossil record. The authors of this study also suggest that Thalattoarchon would have only fed on smaller animals, both alive and dead, a feeding strategy comparable to that of the great white shark. Due to its apex predator adaptations, Thalattoarchon would not likely feed on ammonites, squid, or even fish. All of these characteristics combined with the datatation of this taxon suggested that Thalattoarchon would have been the oldest aquatic megapredator tetrapod known in the fossil record. However, it is possible that the diversification of large ichthyosaurs similar to Thalattoarchon took place during contemporary periods, when marine biodiversity was almost completely recovering from the Permian–Triassic extinction event.

== Palaeoecology ==
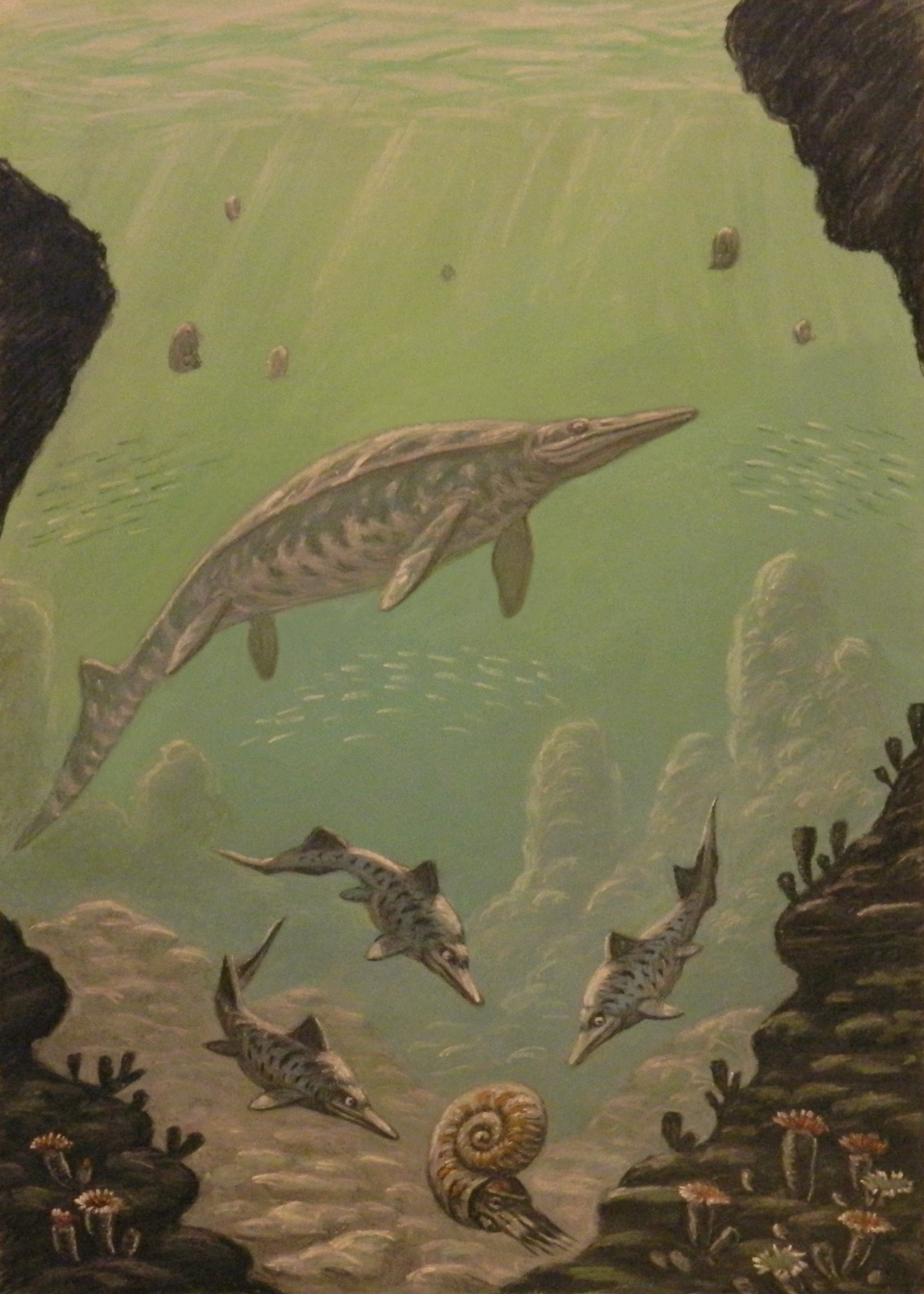
Life restoration of a Cymbospondylus swimming near a group of Phalarodon, two ichthyosaurs contemporary with Thalattoarchon

Thalattoarchon is known from the Favret Formation, which, along with the Prida Formation, constitutes one of the recognized geological formations of the Star Peak Group, located in Nevada. These two formations are linked by a single member, known as the Fossil Hill Member. In the Prida Formation, this member outcrops west of the Humboldt Range, and extends to the Favret Formation, outcropping in the Augusta Mountains, where it reaches up to more than 300 metres (980 ft) wide. Although they are neighbors, the two formations do not share precisely the same age, the Prida one dating from the Middle Anisian, while Favret dates from the Late Anisian, between approximately 244 and 242 million years ago. During this period, the Fossil Hill Member represented the eastern part of the Panthalassan Ocean, and the proven presence of archosaurs like Benggwigwishingasuchus shows that the region would have been coastal.

The significant presence of marine reptiles, ammonites and other invertebrates in the Fossil Hill Member indicates that the surface waters were well aerated, but there is little animal presence in the benthic zones, with the notable exception of bivalves of the family Halobiidae. The fossils found show that the stratigraphic unit was once a pelagic ecosystem with a stable food web. Bony fish are little known and have currently only been discovered in the Favret Formation. Among the fish discovered are the actinopterygians Saurichthys and an undetermined representative, while among the sarcopterygians, numerous specimens of indeterminate coelacanthids are known.

The most abundant marine reptiles of the Fossil Hill Member are the ichthyosaurs, including Thalattoarchon itself. The different species known would have had different feeding strategies to avoid competition. The large Cymbospondylus, and notably C. youngorum, would have mainly fed on fish and squid, but it is possible that it would also have attacked smaller marine reptiles, and possibly juveniles. Phalarodon possess broad crushing teeth suited for crushing prey items with external shells. Omphalosaurus was probably a bulk feeder specialized in grinding up ammonites. Few other marine reptiles are known from the Fossil Hill Member, the only clearly identified being the sauropterygian Augustasaurus.

== See also ==
- List of ichthyosaurs
- Timeline of ichthyosaur research
