= 1956 in paleontology =

List of years in paleontology	(table)
- … 1946; 1947; 1948; 1949; 1950; 1951; 1952; 1953; 1954; 1955; 1956; 1957; 1958; 1959; 1960; 1961; 1962; 1963; 1964; 1965; 1966 …
- In science 1953 1954 1955 1956 1957 1958 1959
- Art; Archaeology; Architecture; Literature; Music; Philosophy; Science; +...

Paleontology or palaeontology is the study of prehistoric life forms on Earth through the examination of plant and animal fossils. This includes the study of body fossils, tracks (ichnites), burrows, cast-off parts, fossilised feces (coprolites), palynomorphs and chemical residues. Because humans have encountered fossils for millennia, paleontology has a long history both before and after becoming formalized as a science. This article records significant discoveries and events related to paleontology that occurred or were published in the year 1956.

== Plants ==
=== Pinophytes ===
Name	Novelty	Status	Authors	Age	Unit	Location	Notes	Images
Sequoiadendron chaneyi	Sp. nov	Valid	Axelrod	Barstovian	Aldrich Station Formation	USA (Nevada)		Sequoiadendron chaneyi

== Archosauromorphs ==
=== Dinosaurs ===
Data courtesy of George Olshevsky's dinosaur genera list.

Name	Status	Authors	Age	Unit	Location	Notes	Images
Euhelopus	Valid taxon	Alfred Sherwood Romer	Early Cretaceous (Barremian to Aptian)	Mengyin Formation	China	A euhelopodid titanosauriform.	Euhelopus
