= Elko Formation =

Geologic formation in Nevada, United States

- Stratigraphic range: Mid Eocene (Uintan)-Mid Miocene; ~46.2–11.6 Ma
- Type: Formation
- Sub-units: Elko Shale

Lithology
- Primary: Shale
- Other: Limestone

Location
- Coordinates: 40.8°N 115.8°W
- Approximate paleocoordinates: 41.5°N 112.9°W
- Region: Nevada
- Country: United States

Type section
- Named for: Elko County
- Elko Formation (the United States) Elko Formation (Nevada)

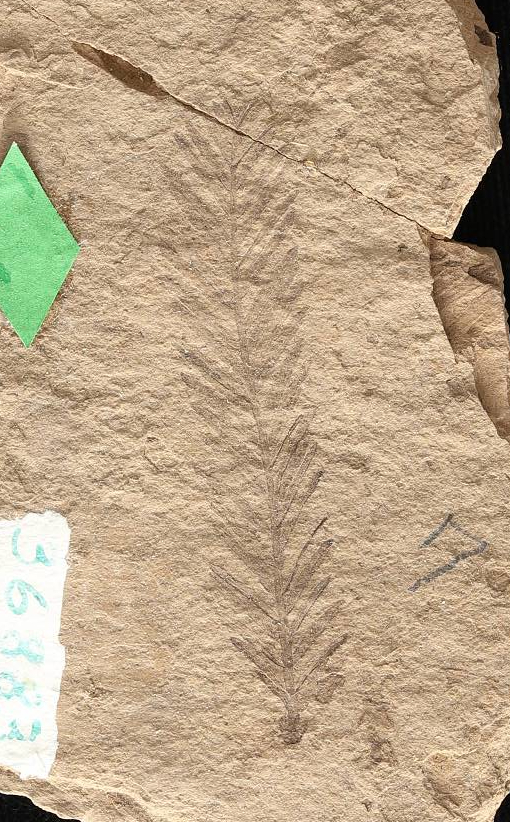
Metasequoia occidentalis Elko Formation

The Elko Formation, also known as Elko Shale(s), is an oil shale geologic formation in Elko County, northern Nevada, United States. The deltaic and lacustrine shales and limestones preserve fossils dating back to the Middle Eocene of the Paleogene to Middle Miocene of the Neogene period. The frog genus Elkobatrachus and ant species Pseudocamponotus elkoanus were named after the formation.

== Description ==
The formation ranges in age from the Middle Eocene (Uintan), with the underlying lower member dated at 46.1 ± 0.1 Ma and the upper member of the Eocene section dated at 38.9 ± 0.3 Ma.

A younger section is dated to the Late Eocene to Early Oligocene (37.2 to 28.4 Ma) and the Elko Shale member is dated to the Middle Miocene (16.0 to 11.6 Ma).

== Fossil content ==
The following fossils were reported from the formation:

- Elkobatrachus brocki
- Miopelodytes gilmorei
- Pseudocamponotus elkoanus
- Candona sp.
- Lymnaea sp.
- Sphaerium sp.
- ?Pontoniella sp.

== See also ==
- List of fossiliferous stratigraphic units in Nevada
- Paleontology in Nevada
- Oil shale
- Middle Eocene Climatic Optimum
- Middle Miocene disruption
