= Rib Hill Formation =

Geologic formation in Nevada, United States

- Stratigraphic range: Permian
- Type: Formation
- Underlies: Arcturus Formation

Lithology
- Primary: sandstone

Location
- Region: Nevada
- Country: United States

The Rib Hill Formation is a geologic formation in Nevada. It preserves fossils dating back to the Permian period.

== See also ==
- List of fossiliferous stratigraphic units in Nevada
- Paleontology in Nevada
