= Vinini Formation =

Geologic formation in Nevada, United States

- Stratigraphic range: Ordovician, Silurian
- Type: Formation

Lithology
- Primary: sandstone
- Other: chert, dolomite (rock), limestone

Location
- Region: Nevada
- Country: United States

The Vinini Formation is a marine, deep-water, sedimentary deposit of Ordovician to Early Silurian age in Nevada, United States. It is notable for its highly varied, mainly siliceous composition, its mineral deposits, and controversies surrounding both its depositional environment and structural history. The formation was named by Merriam and Anderson for an occurrence along Vinini Creek in the Roberts Mountains of central Nevada and that name is now used extensively in the State.

== Stratigraphic relations ==
Although the name Vinini is used extensively, the Palmetto Formation in southern Nevada is of the same age and lithic composition and merits the name Vinini. Originally the Vinini was considered to be wholly of Ordovician age, but the unit designated as Vinini on many published maps includes, at the top, a massive chert unit, the Cherry Spring chert, now known to be of Early Silurian age. The formation is considered to have been deposited in relatively deep water, outboard of the contemporaneous carbonate bank to the east, because of its generally dark gray color and the near absence of a shelly fauna. The identity of strata underlying the Vinini over most of its range is uncertain due to the prevalence of faults, but the equivalent Palmetto Formation is known to be underlain depositionally by Upper Cambrian limestone deposits. The Vinini is overlain depositionally by Middle Silurian sandy strata. To the west, the Vinini grades laterally into the Valmy Formation, a somewhat similar unit, with the same age range. Together, the Vinini and Valmi formations constitute a principal part of lower Paleozoic deep-water units in Nevada known collectively as the "western assemblage". To the east, separated by faults, is a bank of mainly shallow-water shelf carbonate rocks ranging in age from Cambrian to Devonian—the "eastern assemblage". Throughout its extent, the Vinini has been divided into two or three subunits. Regardless of how it has been subdivided, the lower part of the formation, wholly of Ordovician age, is extremely heterogeneous and coarsely granular, and the upper part, of Ordovician and Early Silurian ages, is more uniform and fine-grained, reflecting very different conditions of deposition. The Vinini has remarkably similar lithic and temporal correlatives, with other names, in Idaho, Arkansas (Ketner, 1980), Oklahoma (Ketner, 1980), Texas,(Noble, 1994), and Mexico (Ketner and Noll, 1987).

== Lithic composition ==
This section is based mainly on the descriptions of the type section of the Vinini in the Roberts Mountains by Finney and Perry (1991), and the Vinini in a widespread area of northern Nevada by Ketner (1991).

=== Lower part ===
Regionally, the lower, heterogeneous, part of the Vinini is composed principally of the following components: beds of sandstone composed of the following clasts: quartz grains, fragments of calcareous and phosphatic organisms, the alga Nuia, dolomite rhombs, sponge spicules, and chert grains; less common are beds of conglomerate, feldspathic siltstone, shale, bedded chert, and greenstone. "Rip-up” clasts are common in some areas. These are boulder-size, angular fragments of sandy limestone that, apparently, were "ripped up" by strong currents, from existing strata in a submarine environment. The angularity of these clasts and their similarity to underlying, undisturbed beds indicate very little transport. The proportions of rock types vary stratigraphically and from place to place indicating a laterally varied and temporally shifting environment. Most of the sand-size components appear to be debris shed from the eastern, carbonate, assemblage. However, some beds are composed almost entirely of quartz grains, and this presents a problem: correlative shallow-water carbonate deposits in the eastern assemblage are free from quartz sand and could not have been the source. Based on the age of associated zircons, this sand originated in central Laurentia (Linde et al., 2015), but the means by which the quartz grains reached the Vinini depositional area are unknown.

=== Upper part ===
Regionally, the upper part of the Vinini is composed largely of shale rich in graptolites, commonly overlain by a black, bedded chert unit, and topped by the conspicuously white Cherry Spring chert. Dark, very fine–grained limestone beds composed largely of the alga Nuia are locally present interbedded with the shale, as are quartz sandstone beds. The quartz sandstone beds are approximately correlative with the Eureka Quartzite in the eastern assemblage to the east of the Vinini and are thought to be genetically related to the Eureka (Finney and Perry, 1991). The chert units are notable for their very thick beds. Except for bedding thickness, the black chert unit is like other Paleozoic bedded cherts in appearance, and is brittle, breaking into “cubes.” The Cherry Spring chert is thick-bedded and is white or nearly so, and unlike ordinary dark chert, it is tough and breaks conchoidally.

== Sulfide deposits ==
Sulfide mineral deposits are an integral part of the Vinini, probably formed during deposition of the formation, and are not known to be related to igneous rocks. Iron sulfide (pyrite) and lead sulfide (galena) are present sporadically in the Vinini and, where oxidized, form colorful gossans. Some of these deposits are in the lower part of the Vinini, but most appear to occur within the Cherry Spring chert.

== Origin ==
Originally, the western assemblage including the Vinini was thought to have been deposited close to the eastern assemblage in a “geosyncline” with transitional beds between them. But, beginning in the nineteen seventies, with the development of plate tectonics, the prevailing theory held that the western assemblage is an oceanic deposit originating in the open ocean or a back-arc oceanic basin. More recently, evidence was cited for deposition essentially in situ adjacent to the eastern assemblage. Unquestionably, the formation was deposited in deep water relative to that of the eastern assemblage as indicated by its lithic composition as cited above, but its composition also precludes an oceanic or back-arc origin. The two-fold stratigraphic nature of the Vinini points to a deepening of the sea during deposition. The chert at the top of the upper part was deposited when the sea extended across the continent and, presumably, was at maximum depth in Nevada.,

== Structure ==
The Vinini has been strongly deformed by folding, and by both low-angle and high-angle faulting. In the 1970s and 80s, folds and low-angle faults were ascribed to plate convergence in the Late Devonian by which the western assemblage was thrust or "obducted" via the Roberts Mountains thrust from an ocean basin onto the eastern assemblage at the margin of the continent as cited above. However, there is little evidence for strong tectonic deformation of Late Devonian age and much evidence that the Vinini and other components of the western assemblage were strongly deformed by later tectonic events.

== See also ==
- List of fossiliferous stratigraphic units in Nevada
- Paleontology in Nevada

== Additional Reading ==
- Ketner, K.B. (1980), Stratigraphic and tectonic parallels between Paleozoic geosynclinal siliceous sequences in northern Nevada and those of the Marathon uplift, Texas, and Ouachita Mountains, Arkansas and Oklahoma, in Fouch, T.D. and Magathan, E.R., eds., Paleozoic Paleogeography of west-central United States, Paleogeography Symposium 1, Rocky Mountain Section, Society of Economic Paleontologists and Mineralogists, p. 1-7.
- Ketner, K.B. and Noll, J.H. Jr. (1987), Preliminary geologic map of the Cerro Cobachi area, Sonora, Mexico, U.S. Geological Survey, Miscellaneous Studies Map MF—1980, scale: 1:20,000.
- Linde, G.M., Trexler, J.H., Cashman, P.H., Gehrels, G., and Dickinson, W.R., 2015, New U-Pb geochronologic and Hf isotopic analyses of the Cambrian-Devonian strata of the Roberts Mountains allochthon (RMA) in Nevada constrain their origin and provenance, Geological Society of America, Abstracts with Programs, v. 47, no. 4, p. 56.
- Noble, P.J. (1994), Silurian radiolarian zonation for the Caballos Novaculite, Marathon uplift, west Texas, Bulletins of American Paleontology, v. 106 (345), p. 1–55.
- Noble, P.J., Ketner, K.B., and McClellan, W. (1997), Early Silurian radiolaria from northern Nevada, USA, Marine Micropaleontology, v. 30, p. 215–223.
