= Joana Limestone =

Geologic formation in Nevada, United States

- Stratigraphic range: Early Mississippian series Carboniferous Period
- Type: Formation
- Unit of: White Pine Group
- Underlies: Chainman Formation
- Overlies: Pilot Formation

Lithology
- Primary: Limestone

Location
- Region: White Pine County, Nye County; Nevada
- Country: United States

Type section
- Named for: Joana Mine
- Named by: Spencer, 1917

The Joana Limestone is a limestone geologic formation in White Pine County and Nye County Nevada.

== Description ==
The Joana Limestone was named for exposures at the Joana Mine on the south side of Robinson Canyon, 2 miles north of Ely, Nevada.

It was formed during the Early Mississippian series of the Carboniferous Period.

It preserves fossils dating back to the Carboniferous period.

== See also ==
- List of fossiliferous stratigraphic units in Nevada
- Paleontology in Nevada
