= Nevada Group =

Former geological group

Nevada Group (abandoned)
- Stratigraphic range: Devonian
- Type: Group

Location
- Region: Nevada
- Country: United States

The Nevada Group is an abandoned term for a geologic group in Nevada. The group, reflected a collection of rocks then thought to preserve fossils dating back to the Devonian period.

The term was abandoned as a geologic unit because it is "a collection of distinctive rock units deposited in variety of depositional environments."

== See also ==
- List of fossiliferous stratigraphic units in Nevada
- Paleontology in Nevada
