= Winnemucca Formation =

Geologic formation in northwestern Nevada, United States

- Stratigraphic range: Triassic period
- Type: Geologic formation

Location
- Region: Northwestern Nevada
- Country: United States

Type section
- Named for: Chief Winnemucca (Paiute leader)

The Winnemucca Formation is a Triassic period geologic formation in northwestern Nevada, USA. It is found in the Sonoma Range in Humboldt County.

It preserves fossils dating back to the Triassic period of the Mesozoic Era.

== See also ==
- List of fossiliferous stratigraphic units in Nevada
- Paleontology in Nevada
