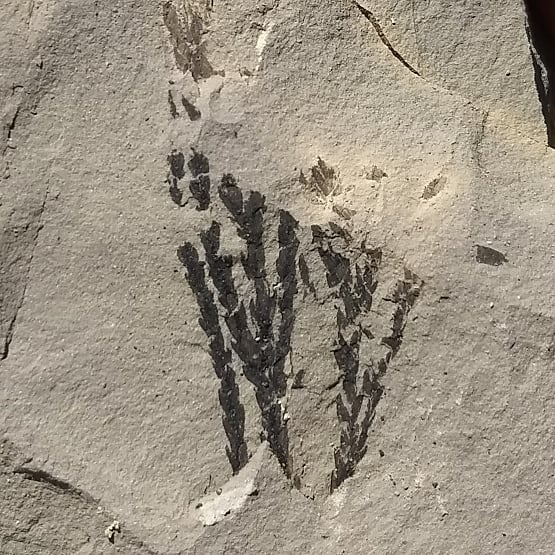
- Foliage fossil from Clark, Nevada

Scientific classification
- Kingdom: Plantae
- Clade: Tracheophytes
- Clade: Gymnospermae
- Division: Pinophyta
- Class: Pinopsida
- Order: Cupressales
- Family: Cupressaceae
- Genus: Sequoiadendron
- Species: †S. chaneyi

Binomial name
- †Sequoiadendron chaneyi Axelrod, 1956

Synonyms
- Sequoiadendron chaneyii

= Sequoiadendron chaneyi =

Sequoiadendron chaneyi Temporal range: Miocene

Extinct species of conifer

Sequoiadendron chaneyi is an extinct species of tree in the Cupressaceae genus Sequoiadendron. Known from Miocene fossils found in Nevada and California, S. chaneyi is the oldest species of Sequoiadendron. The common use of the name "sequoia" generally refers to Sequoiadendron giganteum, which occurs naturally only in the various groves that exist on the western slopes of the Sierra Nevada of California. S. chaneyi is considered the probable direct ancestor to the extant Sequoiadendron giganteum.

== Description ==
This species was found fossilized northeast to the current S. giganteum groves in the Sierra Nevada and near Reno. It was very similar to the modern species, even having the same plants associated with its fossils as the modern Sequoia.

== Occurrences ==
Fossils of Sequoiadendron chaneyi have been described from the Middle Miocene floras found in the area of Middlegate Basin in Churchill County, Nevada. The area of the Middlegate basin is preserved as the Middlegate and Eastgate Formations, which grew along the shores of an ancient lake. While S. chaneyi is found in both formations, it is much rarer in the Middlegate formation, which was a south-facing scrubland-type ecosystem, being represented by only a few twiglets with foliage. In contrast, S. chaneyi is abundant in the Eastgate formation, which was a north-facing forested setting of hills and valleys, being represented by abundant foliage and several cones. Specimens figured as Glyptostrobus by Jack Wolfe in 1964 from the Middlegate basin were re-identified by Daniel Axelrod in 1985 as S. chaneyi, based on morphology and the presence of cones in the same deposits.

Fossils of S. chaneyi have been found in the late Miocene Relief Peak Formation of Alpine County, California. The fossils are found in the topmost section of the Relief Peak Formation at the contact of the formation and the Mount Reba Conglomerate. The stratigraphy and composition of formations indicate that the fossils of the Mount Reba flora were deposited in a low, broad valley environment that drained southwesterly and was exposed to the storm track. While present in the flora, S. chaneyi was a very rare component of it, being known from only three foliage specimens. The specimens were most likely transported downstream from the site where the trees were growing.

S. chaneyi is known from the Middle Miocene Chloropagus Formation deposits of Storey County, Nevada, west of Fernley. While the fossils are locally abundant at several of the Purple Mountain flora sites, it is found as a component at most of the sites. The higher concentrations seem to be associated with those deposits which were formed in mesic bottomlands.
