= Hanson Creek Formation =

Geologic formation in Nevada, United States

- Stratigraphic range: Dapingian-Katian (Ibexian-Richmondian); 488–444 Ma
- Type: Geologic formation
- Underlies: Roberts Mountains Formation
- Overlies: Eureka Quartzite
- Thickness: 350 feet (110 m)

Lithology
- Primary: Limestone
- Other: Dolomite, sandstone

Location
- Coordinates: 39.0°N 116.0°W
- Approximate paleocoordinates: 7.1°S 74.5°W
- Region: Nevada
- Country: United States

Type section
- Named for: Hanson Creek
- Hanson Creek Formation (the United States) Hanson Creek Formation (Nevada)

The Hanson Creek Formation is a geologic formation in Nevada. It preserves fossils dating back to the Dapingian-Katian (Ibexian-Richmondian in the regional stratigraphy) stages of the Ordovician period.

== See also ==
- List of fossiliferous stratigraphic units in Nevada
- Paleontology in Nevada
