= Goughs Canyon Formation =

Geologic formation in Nevada, United States

- Stratigraphic range: Mississippian stage, Carboniferous period
- Type: Geologic formation
- Unit of: Antler orogeny

Lithology
- Primary: volcanic breccia, limestone

Location
- Region: Humboldt County, Nevada
- Country: United States

The Goughs Canyon Formation is a geologic formation in southeastern Humboldt County, Nevada. It preserves fossils dating back to the Mississippian stage of the Carboniferous period.

== See also ==
- List of fossiliferous stratigraphic units in Nevada
- Paleontology in Nevada
