= Johnson Spring Formation =

Geologic formation in California, United States

- Stratigraphic range: Ordovician
- Type: Formation
- Unit of: Eureka Group
- Underlies: Barrel Spring Formation
- Overlies: Ely Springs Dolomite
- Thickness: between 114 feet (35 m) and 398 feet (121 m)

Location
- Region: Inyo Mountains, California
- Country: United States

Type section
- Named by: Harold Richard Pestana

The Johnson Spring Formation is a geologic formation in California. It preserves fossils dating back to the Ordovician period.

Previously described as undifferentiated upper part of Eureka group by Langenheim and others, Pestana formally named the formation in 1960. The Johnson Springs Formation underlies the Barrel Spring Formation and overlies the Ely Springs Dolomite.

The type section is in Lead Canyon Trail section of the Independence quadrangle, Inyo Mountains.

== See also ==
- List of fossiliferous stratigraphic units in California
- Paleontology in California
