= Priada Formation =

Geologic formation in Nevada, United States

- Stratigraphic range: Triassic
- Type: Formation

Location
- Region: Nevada
- Country: United States

The Priada Formation is a geologic formation in Nevada. It preserves fossils dating back to the Triassic period.

== See also ==
- List of fossiliferous stratigraphic units in Nevada
- Paleontology in Nevada
