= Corset Spring Shale =

Geologic formation in Nevada, United States

- Stratigraphic range: Cambrian
- Type: Formation

Lithology
- Primary: Shale
- Other: Limestone

Location
- Region: Nevada
- Country: United States

The Corset Spring Shale is a geologic formation in Nevada. It preserves fossils dating back to the Cambrian period.

== See also ==
- List of fossiliferous stratigraphic units in Nevada
- Paleontology in Nevada
