= Copenhagen Formation =

Geologic formation in Nevada, United States

- Stratigraphic range: Ordovician
- Type: Geologic formation
- Underlies: Eureka Quartzite
- Overlies: Pogonip Group, Antelope Valley Limestone
- Thickness: 350 feet (110 m)

Location
- Region: Nevada
- Country: United States

The Copenhagen Formation is a geologic formation in Nevada.

Areas it is found include the Antelope Valley region of Eureka County and Nye County.

It preserves fossils dating back to the Ordovician period.

== See also ==
- List of fossiliferous stratigraphic units in Nevada
- Paleontology in Nevada
