= Whipple Cave Formation =

Geologic formation in Nevada, United States

- Stratigraphic range: Upper Cambrian–Early Ordovician
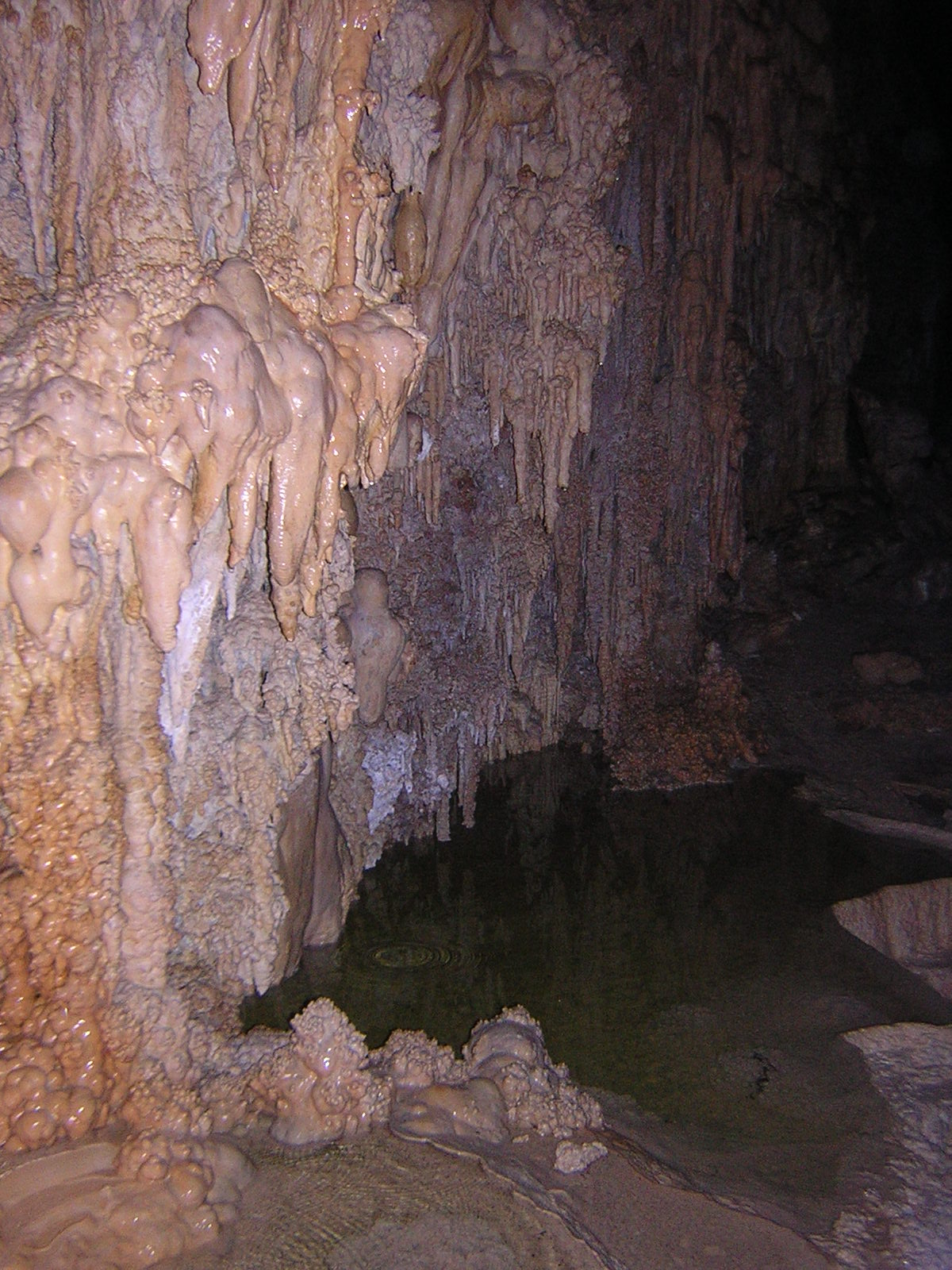
- Wall near the bottom of Whipple Cave
- Type: Formation
- Thickness: 1,400 feet (430 m)

Lithology
- Primary: Limestone, Dolomite

Location
- Region: Nevada
- Country: United States

The Whipple Cave Formation is a geologic formation in Nevada. It preserves fossils dating back to the Cambrian period.

== See also ==
- List of fossiliferous stratigraphic units in Nevada
- Paleontology in Nevada
