= Antler Peak =

Antler Peak may refer to:

- Antler Peak Formation, a geologic formation in Nevada, USA.
- Antler Peak (Washington), a peak in Mount Rainier National Park in Washington, USA.
- Antler Peak (Wyoming), a peak in the Gallatin Range in Yellowstone National Park in Wyoming, USA.
