= Bird Spring Formation =

Geologic formation in Nevada, United States

- Stratigraphic range: Carboniferous-Permian
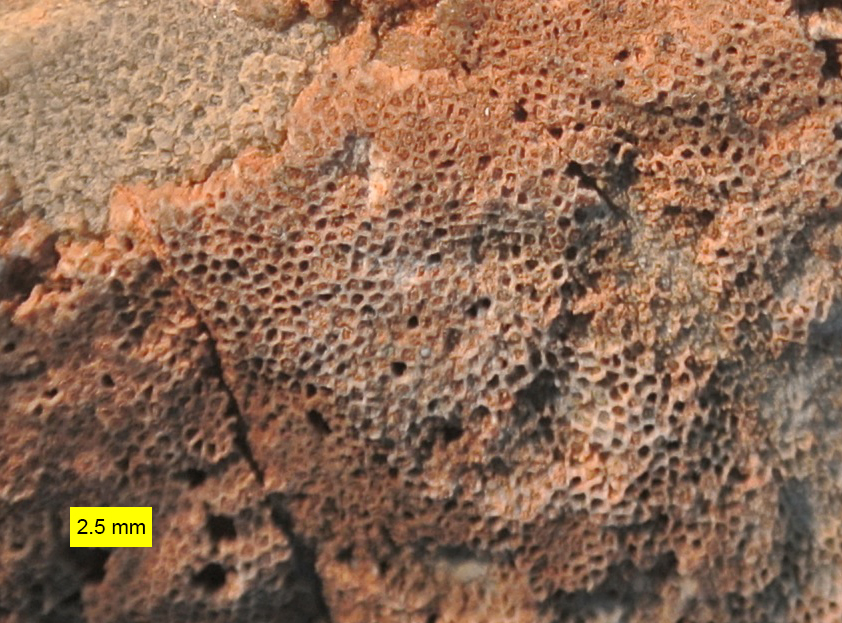
- Fossil from the Bird Spring Formation
- Type: Formation

Location
- Region: Nevada
- Country: United States

The Bird Spring Formation is a geologic formation in Nevada. It preserves fossils dating back to the Carboniferous and Permian periods.

== See also ==
- List of fossiliferous stratigraphic units in Nevada
- Paleontology in Nevada
