= Inskip Formation =

Geologic formation in Nevada, United States

- Stratigraphic range: Mississippian stage, Carboniferous Period
- Type: Geologic formation
- Unit of: Antler orogeny

Location
- Region: Pershing County, Nevada
- Country: United States

The Inskip Formation is a geologic formation in eastern Pershing County, Nevada.

It preserves fossils dating back to the Mississippian stage of the Carboniferous period.

== See also ==
- List of fossiliferous stratigraphic units in Nevada
- Paleontology in Nevada
