= White Narrows Formation =

Geologic formation in Nevada, United States

- Type: Formation

Location
- Region: Nevada
- Country: United States

The White Narrows Formation is a geologic formation in Nevada that preserves fossils.

== See also ==
- List of fossiliferous stratigraphic units in Nevada
- Paleontology in Nevada
