= Arcturus Formation =

Geologic formation in Nevada and Utah, United States

- Stratigraphic range: Permian
- Type: Formation

Location
- Region: Nevada, Utah
- Country: United States

The Arcturus Formation is a geologic formation in Nevada and Utah, United States. It preserves fossils dating back to the Permian period. Platy limestone with silty interbeds characterize this formation. It lies above Riepetown Formation and below Kaibab Formation.

== See also ==
- List of fossiliferous stratigraphic units in Nevada
- List of fossiliferous stratigraphic units in Utah
- Paleontology in Nevada
- Paleontology in Utah
