= Secret Canyon Shale =

Geologic formation in Nevada, United States

- Stratigraphic range: Cambrian
- Type: Formation

Lithology
- Primary: shale
- Other: limestone

Location
- Region: Nevada
- Country: United States

The Secret Canyon Shale is a geologic formation in Nevada. It preserves fossils dating back to the Cambrian period.

== See also ==
- List of fossiliferous stratigraphic units in Nevada
- Paleontology in Nevada
