= Jennifer Monson =

American dancer and choreographer

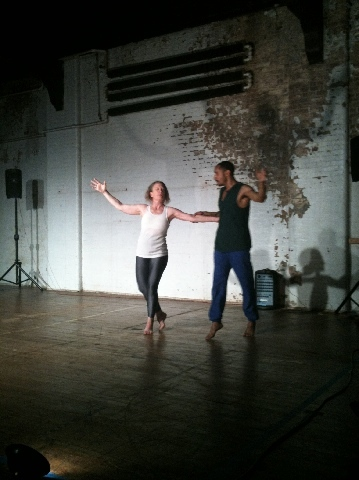
- Monson (left) with Niall Jones, 2012.
- Born: March 14, 1961 (age 65)
- Education: Sarah Lawrence College
- Occupations: Dancer; choreographer

Jennifer Monson (born March 14, 1961) is an American dancer and choreographer. She has been actively creating dance work since the 1980s. She works with dance improvisation and creates choreography that is at times improvised or devised through scores, as well as collaborating with other dancers, visual artists, architects and scientists. Monson grew up in southern California and, at one point, wanted to be a park ranger. She was awarded the Foundation for Contemporary Arts Grants to Artists award (1998) and in 2000, Monson received the Creative Capital Performing Arts Award. She now resides in Illinois as a professor at the University of Illinois Urbana Champaign, after living in Williamsburg in Brooklyn from 1991–2002. At one point, she was also involved with the University of Vermont, where she was a professor at large from 2010–2016 with the dance, environmental studies, and library faculty.

== Early life ==
Monson was born on March 14, 1961 in Claremont, California. She is the daughter of Julie and Jim Monson (1932-2021). She is the youngest of three children. Her siblings are John and Jamie.

== Choreographic works ==
Jennifer Monson began choreographing in 1983, after graduating from Sarah Lawrence College in Vermont. In 2000, she began to dive into dance in relationship to the environment almost exclusively, and by 2005, she had created iLAND. Four of her projects, "BIRD BRAIN", "iMAP/Ridgewood Reservoir", "The Mahomet Aquifer Project", and "SIP/Watershed", were crucial in her career of altering the role that dance plays in people's understanding on the environment. Her works have been presented all over the New York City area including the Kitchen and the Danspace Project.

=== BIRD BRAIN ===
One of her first projects, "BIRD BRAIN", was a touring project that followed the navigational paths of migratory birds and grey whales. The project explored the navigational habits of the animals, along with their physical and metaphorical relationship to humans. It took place over several years (2000-2005), involved site-specific dance performances, discussions with the dancers and scientists involved, workshops for the public, and a website that tracked the animals, as well as the dancers.

=== iMAP/Ridgewood Reservoir ===
Her next large project, "iMAP (Interdisciplinary Mobile Architecture and Performance)/ Ridgewood Reservoir", took place in 2007, and was a collaborative project with architect Gita Nandan, landscape architect Elliott Maltby, and composer Kenta Nagai. This project was a mobile performance space based in Highland Park in New York City, which lead to a series of performances throughout 2007. The four collaborators on the project worked to express the adaptation and symbiosis processes that occur naturally through these performances.

=== The Mahomet Aquifer Project ===
In 2009, after she relocated to Illinois, she created "The Mahomet Aquifer Project", and worked to integrate the communities of East-Central Illinois that rely on the Mahomet Aquifer. Monson created choreography based on conversations with scientists about people's relationship to water. The movement represents all parts of the aquifer, from location, to history, to economics. With a mobile gallery for viewing, this project also involved images on the geology of the aquifer to enhance the audiences' perspective of the human-to-water relationship. Other people involved in the formation of this project were composer Chris Cogburn, designer Katrin Schnabl, and performers Kyli Klevens, Stephan May, Amy Swanson, and Stephan West. Like "BIRD BRAIN", this project also utilized panel discussion about the project and its goals.

=== SIP/Watershed ===
"SIP/Watershed" was created in October 2010, alongside Chris Cogburn, Katrin Schnabl, Kate Cahill and Maggie Bennett. "SIP", standing for "sustained immersive process", was choreographed based on the water near New York City. With performances spaces on Governors Island, under the Manhattan Bridge, the Nature Walk at Newtown Creek Sewage Plant, 59th Street at 12th Avenue, and 164th Street at the Hudson River, the research for this project was extensive. The group of collaborators took trips to the Hudson River in the Adirondack Mountains, the Catskill Mountains near the Ashokan Reservoir, and New York City's outer edge by the water in order to gain knowledge and inspiration.

== iLAND ==
Created in 2005, iLAND has been doing more than just dance performances. The organization researches in art and science for each project, in order to promote people's understanding of nature and the environment around them. iLAND has also created the iLAB residency program, the iLAND Symposium, and iLANDing.

The iLAB residency program was created in 2006, and is open to dancers, visual artists and natural and social scientists of all kinds. The goal is to provide opportunities for these people to engage with the environment around New York City. iLAB strives the re-imagine the relationships between people and the environment in urban areas specifically, and support the engagement through the disciplines of dance and art. The iLAND Symposium is a way to provide information about the urban environment through panels, presentations, workshops, performances, and more. Since, 2009, there have been about seven major projects created through it. Lastly, A Field Guide to iLANDing, is a book, published in 2017, including scores and methodologies used by the collaborators on the projects produced by the organization.

== Personal life ==
She is openly gay and a lebsian.
