= Roberts Mountains Formation =

Geologic formation in Nevada and Idaho

- Stratigraphic range: Silurian period
- Type: Geologic formation
- Underlies: Lone Mountain Dolomite
- Overlies: Hanson Creek Formation
- Thickness: 600 feet (180 m)

Location
- Region: Nevada, Idaho
- Country: United States

The Roberts Mountains Formation is a geologic formation in Nevada and Idaho.

It preserves fossils dating back to the Silurian period.

== See also ==
- List of fossiliferous stratigraphic units in Nevada
- Paleontology in Nevada
- Roberts Mountains
