= Tor Limestone =

Geologic formation in Nevada, United States

- Stratigraphic range: Devonian
- Type: Formation

Location
- Region: Nevada
- Country: United States

The Tor Limestone is a geologic formation in Nevada. It preserves fossils dating back to the Devonian period.

== See also ==
- List of fossiliferous stratigraphic units in Nevada
- Paleontology in Nevada
