= Prida Formation =

Geologic formation in Nevada, United States

- Stratigraphic range: Triassic
- Type: Formation

Location
- Region: Nevada
- Country: United States

The Prida Formation is a geologic formation in northwestern Nevada. It preserves fossils dating back to the Triassic period.

== Fossil Hill Member ==
The Prida Formation, along with the Favret Formation, constitute one of the recognized geological formations within the Star Peak Group of northwestern Nevada. These two formations are linked by a single member, known as the Fossil Hill Member. In the Prida Formation, this member outcrops in the western Humboldt Range, while the Favret Formation, outcrops in the Augusta Mountains, where it reaches up to more than 300 metres (980 ft) thick. Although they overlap substantially, the two formations do not share precisely the same age, the Prida unit dates from the Middle to Late Anisian, while the Favret unit dates only from the Late Anisian, between approximately 244 and 242 million years ago.

The Fossil Hill Member has received extensive interest from paleontological research for its large quantity of marine fossils dating from the Middle Triassic. The environment preserved in the Fossil Hill contains some of the earliest marine reptile communities including Ichthyosaurs and Pistosaurs. Other fossils from this unit include invertebrates such as ceratitid ammonoids and bivalves as well as hybodont sharks and bony fish like Saurichthyes and Birgeria.

== See also ==
- List of fossiliferous stratigraphic units in Nevada
- Paleontology in Nevada
