= Banner Formation =

Geologic formation in Nevada, United States

- Stratigraphic range: Late Mississippian stage, Carboniferous Period
- Type: Geologic formation
- Underlies: Nelson Formation
- Overlies: Grossman Formation
- Thickness: 600 feet (180 m) (maximum)

Lithology
- Primary: conglomerate, sandstone, limestone

Location
- Region: Elko County, Nevada
- Country: United States

The Banner Formation is a Carboniferous period geologic formation in northern Elko County, Nevada.

It is composed of conglomerate, sandstone, and limestone and was formed in connection with the Antler orogeny.

It preserves fossils dating back to the Early Late Mississippian stage of the Carboniferous period during the Paleozoic Era.

== See also ==
- List of fossiliferous stratigraphic units in Nevada
- Paleontology in Nevada
