= Mahomet Aquifer =

Aquifer in east-central Illinois

The Mahomet Aquifer is the most important aquifer in east-central Illinois. Composed of sand and gravel, it is part of the buried Mahomet Bedrock Valley. It underlies 15 counties and ranges from 50 to 200 feet (15 to 60 m) thick. It supplies over 100,000,000 US gallons (380,000 kL) per day of groundwater for public water use, industrial supply, and irrigation.

== Hydrogeologic setting ==
The Mahomet Aquifer consists of sand and gravel deposited by glacial meltwater flowing westward along the Mahomet Bedrock Valley during the Pre-Illinoian glacial episode. This bedrock valley forms the western part of the Teays-Mahomet Bedrock Valley System that extends into Illinois from Indiana (Larson et al., 2003). Most of the sand and gravel of the Mahomet Aquifer is from the lower half of the Banner Formation and belongs to the Mahomet Sand Member which is buried 100 to 200 feet (30 to 61 m) below the ground surface.

The aquifer underlies 1,260,000 acres (510,000 hectares) of land in east-central Illinois and spans 15 counties (Panno and Korab, 2000). The Mahomet ranges from 4 to 15 miles (6 to 24 km) and 50 to 200 feet (15 to 60 m) thick, although the average thickness is 100 feet (30 m). The aquifer is confined except in Mason, Menard, and Tazewell Counties in the west near the Illinois River.

== Groundwater use ==
The Mahomet Aquifer supplies approximately 850,000 people with water. The Illinois Bureau of the Budget projects that the population could increase to about 910,000 people by 2020. An estimated 100,000,000 US gallons (380,000 kL) per day of groundwater is pumped from the aquifer to supply municipal, agricultural, commercial, industrial, and rural domestic users (Larson et al., 2003). Approximately 45% of the water withdrawn is consumed by the public, 29% by industry, and 18% by commercial users (Panno and Korab, 2000). The remaining percentage is for other uses such as livestock and irrigation.

As the population increases and economic growth occurs in the region, the demand for water also rises. Concern about additional groundwater withdrawal and the resulting repercussions has encouraged planning, management, and groundwater studies. The Illinois State Geological Survey and the Illinois State Water Survey have collected data that indicate declining water levels in certain parts of the Mahomet Aquifer.

== Water quality ==
The water quality in the Mahomet Aquifer is high in dissolved minerals and iron, which is typical of all groundwater. Neither of these pose a human health risk. One contaminant that is of concern is naturally occurring arsenic. The arsenic leaches from oxidized pyrite. Concentrations can range from 20 to 70 parts per billion (ppb), which exceeds the new standard adopted by the U.S. Environmental Protection Agency (Panno and Korab, 2000). The new standard is 10 ppb. Water-supply systems must comply with the new standard from January 23, 2006 (EPA, 2004). The arsenic can be effectively removed with commercially available water-treatment systems.

== Mahomet Aquifer Consortium ==
The Mahomet Aquifer Consortium (MAC) was formed in 1998 with the purpose of developing a study and management plan for the aquifer. The group consists of 70 representatives from the public, water authorities, water companies, professional groups, and local, county, state, and federal governments. The goal of the MAC is to study the aquifer so that informed decisions can be made about meeting future water demand as populations increase and extreme weather events occur (MAC, 2004).
