= Riepetown Formation =

Geologic formation in Nevada, U.S.

- Stratigraphic range: Permian
- Type: Formation

Location
- Region: Nevada
- Country: United States

The Riepetown Formation is a geologic formation in Nevada. It preserves fossils dating back to the Permian period.

== See also ==
- List of fossiliferous stratigraphic units in Nevada
- Paleontology in Nevada
