= Chainman Formation =

Geologic formation in Nevada, United States

- Stratigraphic range: Carboniferous
- Type: Formation

Lithology
- Primary: shale

Location
- Region: Nevada
- Country: United States

The Chainman Formation is a geologic formation in Nevada. It preserves fossils dating back to the Carboniferous period.

== See also ==
- List of fossiliferous stratigraphic units in Nevada
- Paleontology in Nevada
