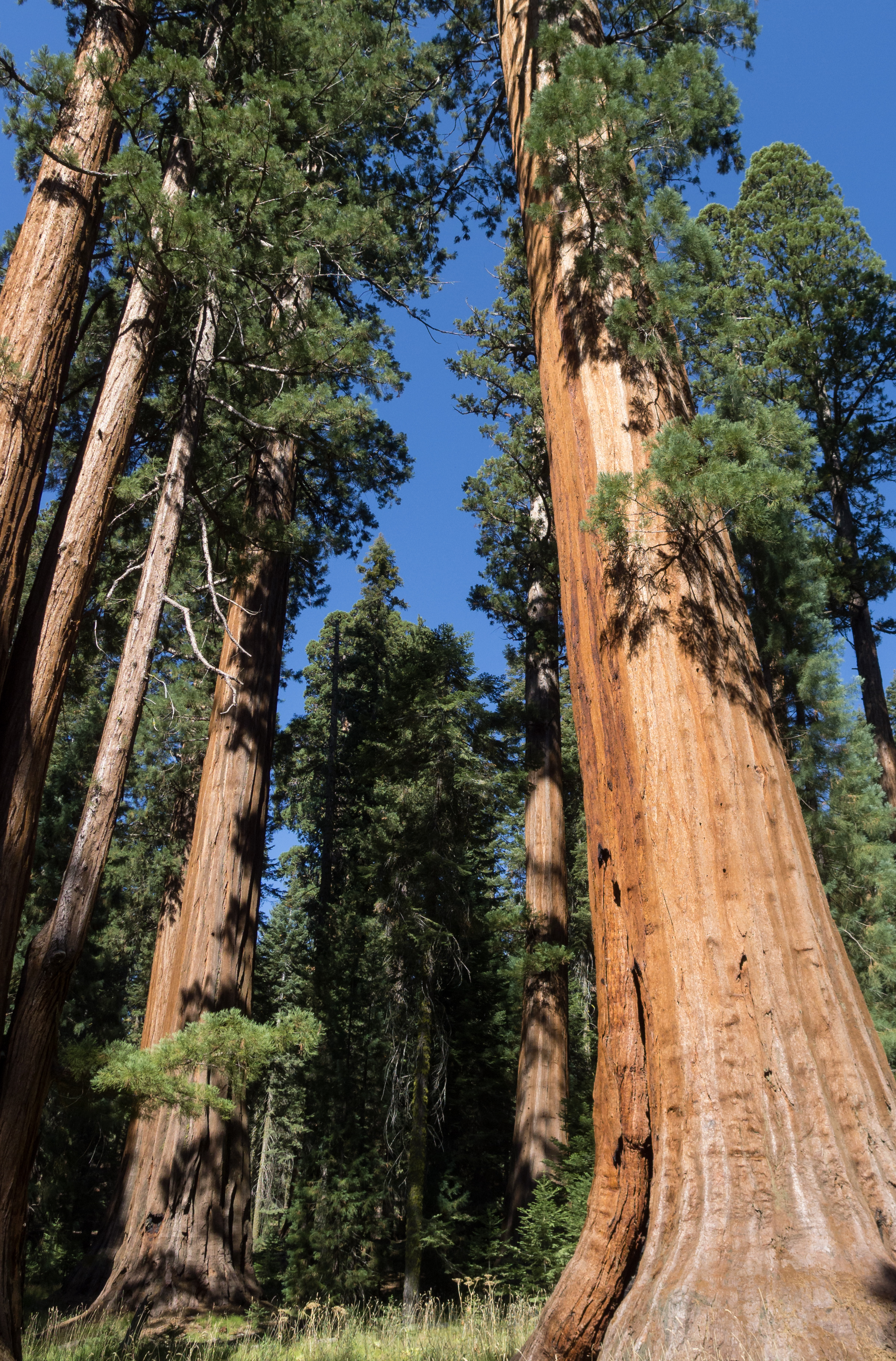
- Trees in Sequoia National Park

Scientific classification
- Kingdom: Plantae
- Clade: Tracheophytes
- Clade: Gymnosperms
- Division: Pinophyta
- Class: Pinopsida
- Order: Cupressales
- Family: Cupressaceae
- Subfamily: Sequoioideae
- Genus: Sequoiadendron; J.Buchholz

Type species
- Sequoiadendron giganteum (Lindley) J.Buchholz

Species
- S. giganteum (Lindl.) J.Buchholz; †S. chaneyi; †S. tchucoticum

Synonyms
- Sequoiadendron synonymy: Americus Hanford, rejected name; Steinhauera C.Presl 1838, not Goepp. 1835 (Altingiaceae); Washingtonia Winslow 1854, rejected name, not H. Wendl. 1879 (Arecaceae) not Raf. ex J.M. Coult. & Rose 1900 (Apiaceae); Wellingtonia Lindl. 1853, illegitimate homonym, not Meisn. 1840 (Sabiaceae)

= Sequoiadendron =

Sequoiadendron Temporal range: Santonian– Present

Genus of conifers in the cypress family Cupressaceae

Sequoiadendron is a genus of evergreen trees, with three species, only one of which survives to the present:

- Sequoiadendron giganteum, extant, commonly known as wellingtonia, giant redwood and giant sequoia, growing naturally in the Sierra Nevada mountains of California
- †Sequoiadendron chaneyi, the predecessor of Sequoiadendron giganteum, found mostly in the Nevada area of the Tertiary Colorado Plateau until the late Miocene
- †Sequoiadendron tchucoticum Late Cretaceous; Enmyvaam River Basin, Russia

== Fossil record ==
Sequoiadendron fossil pollen and macrofossils may have been found as early as the Late Cretaceous and throughout the Northern Hemisphere, including locations in western Georgia in the Caucasus region.

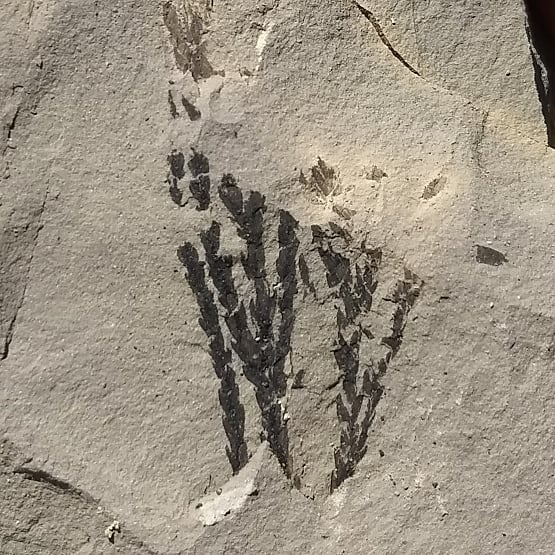
Sequoiadendron chaneyi foliage fossil, Nevada, United States
