= Barrel Springs Formation =

Geologic formation in Texas, United States

- Stratigraphic range: Tertiary
- Type: Formation

Location
- Region: Texas
- Country: United States

The Barrel Springs Formation is a geologic formation in Texas. It dates as early Tertiary (Eocene to Oligocene).
