= Park City Group =

American software-as-a-service business

Park City Group, Inc.
- Company type: Public
- Traded as: Nasdaq: PCYG; Russell 2000 Index component
- Industry: Technology – Business Software & Services
- Founded: 2002; 24 years ago
- Headquarters: Salt Lake City, Utah, U.S.
- Key people: Randall K. Fields (CEO, president, and chairman); Edward L. Clissold (CFO, and Principal Accounting Officer) (Dec 31, 2013)
- Revenue: $ 11.74M (Dec 31, 2013)
- Number of employees: 48 (Dec 31, 2013)
- Website: www.parkcitygroup.com

Park City Group, Inc. was established in 1990, and is headquartered in Salt Lake City, Utah. The company focuses on software-as-a-service (SaaS) for the suppliers and retailers in the whole supply chain, reducing out-of-stocks, optimizing inventory, and improving profits and operational efficiencies. In 2009, the company acquired Prescient Applied Intelligence to the new “Park City Group". In 2013, the company moved trading in its shares from the NYSE, formerly the American Stock Exchange, to the NASDAQ Capital Market.

== History ==
In the 1970s, Randall Fields established a Palo Alto-based consulting firm named "Fields Investment Group." The company moved its headquarters to Park City in 1982.

== Products and services ==
Products include Store Level Replenishment, which provides visibility to store level activity; ResposiTrak, which traces products in supply chain, and ActionManager, an automated method to manage the business process. In addition, the company provides consulting for business optimization, technical services, and training.

== Awards ==
In 2013, Park City Group was ranked 381st on Deloitte Fast 500 for companies in the field of technology, media, telecommunications, life sciences, and clean technology in North America.
