= Favret Formation =

Triassic geologic formation

- Stratigraphic range: Triassic
- Type: Geological formation
- Unit of: Augusta Sequence

Lithology
- Primary: Limestone
- Other: Shale, siltstone

Location
- Region: Nevada

The Favret Formation is a Triassic geologic formation. The Favret outcrops in the Augusta, New Pass and Fish Creek ranges of north central Nevada and consists of limestone, shale and siltstone.

== Fossil Hill Member ==
The Favret Formation along with the Prida Formation, constitute one of the recognized geological formations within the Star Peak Group of northwestern Nevada. These two formations are linked by a single member, known as the Fossil Hill Member. In the Prida Formation, this member outcrops in the western Humboldt Range, while the Favret Formation, outcrops in the Augusta Mountains, where it reaches up to more than 300 metres (980 ft) thick. Although they overlap substantially, the two formations do not share precisely the same age, the Prida unit dates from the Middle to Late Anisian, while the Favret unit dates only from the Late Anisian, between approximately 244 and 242 million years ago.

The Fossil Hill Member has received extensive interest from paleontological research for its large quantity of marine fossils dating from the Middle Triassic. The paleoenvironment preserved in the Fossil Hill contains some of the earliest marine reptile communities including Ichthyosaurs and Pistosaurs. Other fossils from this unit include invertebrates such as ceratitid ammonoids and bivalves as well as hybodont sharks and bony fish like Saurichthyes and Birgeria.

== See also ==
- Plesiosaur stratigraphic distribution
