= Anagymnotoceras =

Scientific classification
- Kingdom: Animalia
- Phylum: Mollusca
- Class: Cephalopoda
- Subclass: †Ammonoidea
- Order: †Ceratitida
- Family: †Ceratitidae
- Genus: †Anagymnotoceras; McLearn, 1966

Genus of molluscs (fossil)

Anagymnotoceras is an extinct genus of cephalopods belonging to the Ammonite subclass.
