= Pseudocamponotus =

Scientific classification
- Domain: Eukaryota
- Kingdom: Animalia
- Phylum: Arthropoda
- Class: Insecta
- Order: Hymenoptera
- Family: Formicidae
- Subfamily: Formicinae
- Tribe: Camponotini
- Genus: †Pseudocamponotus; Carpenter, 1930
- Species: †P. elkoanus

Binomial name
- †Pseudocamponotus elkoanus Carpenter, 1930

Genus of ant

Pseudocamponotus is an extinct, monotypic genus of ant. This genus was first described by F.M. Carpenter in 1930. The type species is Pseudocamponotus elkoanus, whose fossil was found in Nevada.
