= Eureka Quartzite =

- Stratigraphic range: Ordovician
- Type: Geologic formation
- Underlies: Hanson Creek Formation
- Overlies: Copenhagen Formation
- Thickness: 150 ft (46 m) (in southern Nevada)

Lithology
- Primary: Quartzite

Location
- Region: California, Nevada, Utah, Idaho; British Columbia; Alberta
- Country: United States; Canada
- Extent: 2,200 km (1,400 mi)

Type section
- Named for: Eureka, Nevada
- Year defined: 1883

The Eureka Quartzite is an extensive Paleozoic marine sandstone deposit in western North America that is notable for its great extent, extreme purity, consistently fine grain size of Quartzite, and its tendency to form conspicuous white cliffs visible from afar.

The Eureka is commonly underlain and overlain by contrasting slope-forming limestone and dolomite strata, all of Ordovician age. It was named in 1883 for the Eureka mineral district in Nevada, and that name is used almost exclusively in Nevada, but, in ensuing years, as extensions of the deposit were discovered in other areas, the same formation was given many other local names.

== Description ==
=== Extent ===
By whatever name, the Eureka can be traced, with gaps, from Nevada northward through Idaho into western Canada along the British Columbia-Alberta boundary, and southward to southeastern California, a north–south extent of about 2,200 kilometres (1,400 mi). An isolated exposure was identified in Sonora, Mexico 950 kilometres (590 mi) south of its most southerly exposure in California, but that occurrence probably was tectonically displaced there from California. The Eureka and its correlatives are lenticular in cross-section: in Nevada and Utah the formation extends more than 300 kilometres (190 mi) east-west, thinning out in both directions from maxima along its axis of more than 150 metres (490 ft). In Canada the east–west extent is much less but there also, it thins out to both east and west.

=== Composition ===
Cliff-forming quartzite, the principle part of the Eureka, is composed of more than 99 percent quartz, which includes both the sand grains and the cement that binds them. The quartz cement accounts for its outstanding hardness and resistance to erosion. Minor constituents are grains of zircon and tourmaline and a trace of feldspar. All of the constituents in Nevada and Utah are less than 1 mm (0.039 in) in diameter; those in Canada are slightly larger. Bioturbation is believed to account for the scarcity of internal bedding.

=== Origin ===
Almost all of the constituent grains of the formation were deposited in a near-shore environment, mainly in shallow water, and to a much lesser extent on the beach as determined by the nature of bedding from place to place. The surfaces of the quartz grains are almost universally "frosted" or abraded, indicating that they, at one time or another, occupied a subaerial environment. Almost all of the constituent grains were determined to have originated in Canada, and were carried southward by currents along the eastern shore of the Paleozoic sea. This concept is supported by several lines of evidence: (1) the only plausible source of such a large volume of sand is in Canada at about 56° north latitude where Cambrian sandstone was exposed extensively in Ordovician time; (2) the base of the formation decreases in age from north to south as determined by marine fossils in subjacent beds; (3) the formation becomes finer grained from north to south apparently due to progressive abrasion of the grains along the way; and (4) the radiometric age of constituent zircon grains points to a northern source.

== See also ==
- List of fossiliferous stratigraphic units in Nevada
- List of fossiliferous stratigraphic units in California
