= Star Peak Group =

Geologic formation in Nevada, United States

Star Peak Group (SPG)
- Stratigraphic range: Triassic
- Type: Group

Location
- Region: Nevada
- Country: United States

The Star Peak Group is a geologic group in Nevada. It preserves fossils dating back to the Triassic period. The group is named for Star Peak.

== See also ==
- List of fossiliferous stratigraphic units in Nevada
- Paleontology in Nevada
