= Paleontology in Nevada =

Paleontological research in the U.S. state of Nevada

The location of the state of Nevada

Paleontology in Nevada refers to paleontological research occurring within or conducted by people from the U.S. state of Nevada. Nevada has a rich fossil record of plants and animal life spanning the past 650 million years of time. The earliest fossils from the state are from Esmeralda County, and are Late Proterozoic in age and represent stromatolite reefs of cyanobacteria, amongst these reefs were some of the oldest known shells in the fossil record, the Cloudina-fauna. Much of the Proterozoic and Paleozoic fossil story of Nevada is that of a warm, shallow, tropical sea, with a few exceptions towards the Late Paleozoic. As such, many fossils across the state are those of marine animals, such as trilobites, brachiopods, bryozoans, honeycomb corals, archaeocyaths, and horn corals.

After the Paleozoic, tectonic activity on the western margin of North America increased. This increase in tectonism forced portions of Nevada formerly below sea level higher. In the Triassic period, northern and central Nevada were shallow seaways between mountainous island arcs, while in southern Nevada the same story as Petrified Forest National Park played out in the swamps at the edge of the continent. By Cretaceous time all of Nevada was above sea level and was mostly mountainous. In the shallow seaways of the Triassic lived the Ichthyosaurs; typified by the Nevada State Fossil Shonisaurus popularis. While in the Jurassic and Cretaceous periods, dinosaurs and other land animals roamed the state.

After the Mesozoic in the Cenozoic the story of Nevada is one of extension. As the mountains that had been built while dinosaurs were alive began to fall down under their own weight, the modern Basin and Range began. Early Cenozoic Paleogene records are rare, whereas Late Cenozoic Neogene records are plentiful across the state. These Neogene basins record a diverse mammalian biota including camels, horses, giant ground sloths, rhinos, tapirs, and other common Neogene taxa. During this time much of Nevada is also occupied by oak and redwood forests rather than the modern sagebrush steppe.

The Quaternary of Nevada is typified by large pluvial lakes the largest being Lake Lahontan and Lake Bonneville. The deposits of this period show evidence of mammoths, a mastodon from Elko County, sabre-toothed cats, dire wolves, giant short-faced bears, as well as most of the animals still found in the Great Basin and Mojave Deserts today.

== Prehistory ==
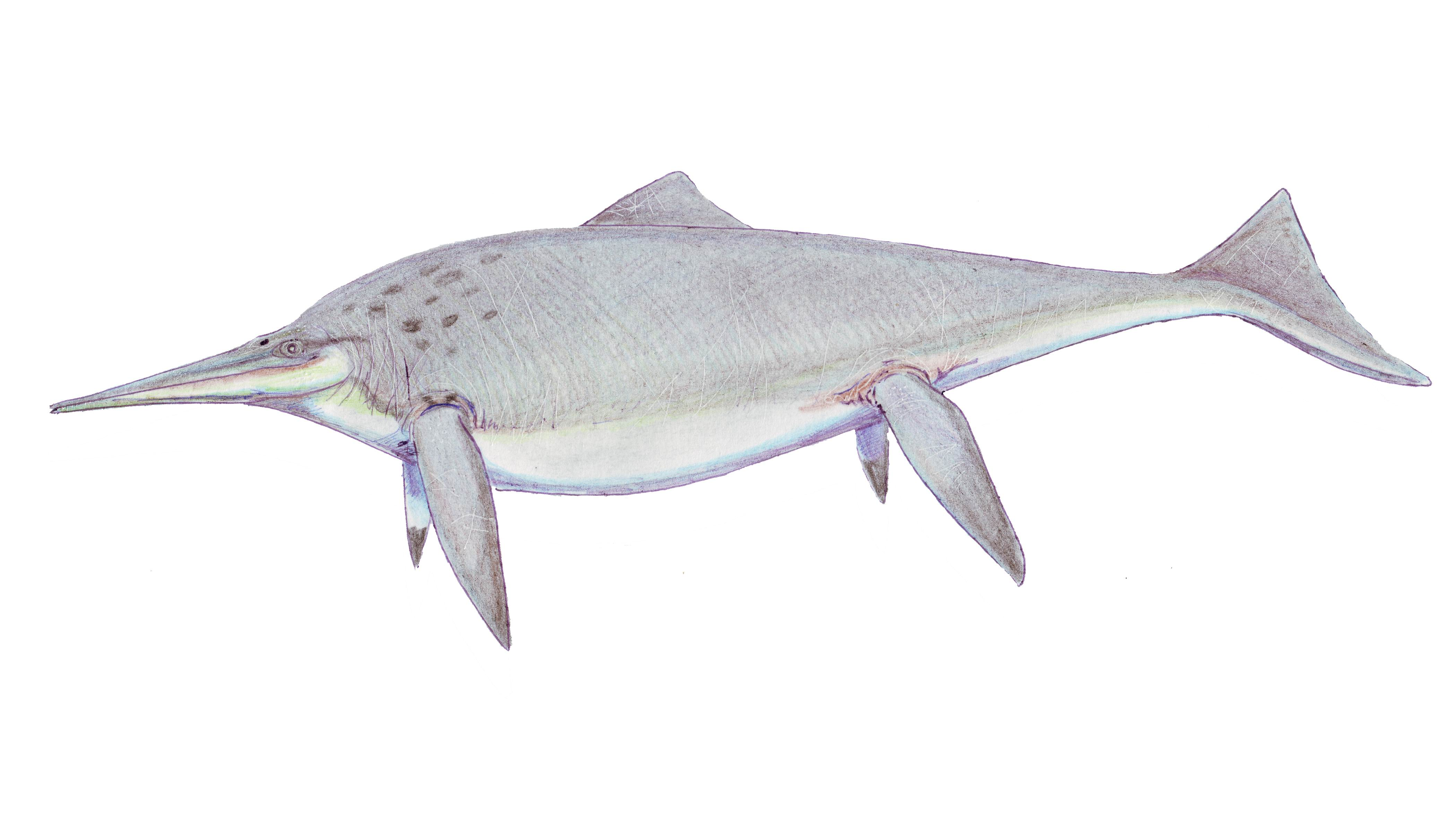
Shonisaurus popularis.

During the Late Precambrian eastern and southern Nevada was being gradually covered by a shallow sea. Blue-green bacteria from this time period were preserved in those areas of the state. More than 500 kinds of Paleozoic invertebrates are known to have inhabited Nevada during the Cambrian, Devonian, and Carboniferous periods of the Paleozoic era. Most of the invertebrates known from this time were freshwater mollusks. The sea continued to expand into the state through the Devonian. During that period northwestern Nevada's sea began to get deeper, gradually becoming an ocean basin. These deeper water areas of Devonian Nevada were home to drifting animals like graptolites. The shallower water regions were home to reefs. Near the end of the Devonian an interval of mountain building called the Antler Orogeny began. The Antler Orogeny continued into the Early Carboniferous. Dropping sea levels exposed regions of Nevada as dry land. Environments of eastern Nevada included lagoons and beaches. Local plant life were preserved in rocks formed by these deposits. Northern and northeastern Nevada were still home to reef habitats. Northwestern Nevada was still a deep ocean. Its abundant plankton left behind many fossils.

Nevada's sea level continued to drop during the Triassic period. However, the western part of the state was still relatively deep. It was home to a rich ammonite and ichthyosaur fauna. During the Triassic, many invertebrates lived and died in the area now occupied by the Shoshone Mountains. Their fossils are scientifically significant as many are now used as index fossils or were completely unknown to science before their discovery here. By the Jurassic, the only deep marine habitats of Nevada were in the northwestern part of the state. Central Nevada was only under shallow water and the eastern and southern parts of the state were characterized by other types of environment. During the Cretaceous, a volcanic island chain formed in far western Nevada. Contemporary plant fossils from Nevada include "twigs" of petrified wood preserved in Eureka County. These may be the remnants of ancient Sequoia trees. Local dinosaurs included armored dinosaurs, possible duck-billed dinosaurs and relatives of the horned dinosaurs.

During the Cenozoic geologic upheaval created the state's Basin and Range physiographic province. Woodlands harboring trees like oak, redwood, and willow formed in Nevada. Local wildlife included creatures like horses, mammoths, and rhinoceroses. Volcanic eruptions regularly shook the state during the Cenozoic. Some of Nevada's Miocene life was preserved in the sediments composing what are now known as the Truckie Beds of the Kawich Mountains northeast of modern Las Vegas. Local bodies of fresh water were inhabited by mollusks at the time. On land Nevada was home to a variety of mammals including both mastodons and rhinoceroses. As the Cenozoic continued, Nevada's Sierra Nevada Mountains were raised. Volcanic activity was still ongoing. Local wildlife included Camelops, horses, mammoths, and giant ground sloths. Nevada's trace fossil record from the Pleistocene is very rich. One site preserved the footprints of a diverse menagerie of creatures including birds, giant sloths, horses, American lions, mastodons, and dire wolves.

== Mesozoic ==
Triassic 251-201 MA During the Triassic most of Central and Northern Nevada was a shallow tropical seaway. Famous ammonite localities occur from Esmeralda County north through Churchill County, into Humboldt County. The most famous of vertebrate inhabitants of this shallow seaway were ichthyosaurs, a diverse biota of Triassic ichthyosaurs has been found across the state, including the state fossil Shonisaurus. Recent finds have also included large highly carnivorous ichthyosaur species recently found in Pershing County. Ichthyosaurs in the Triassic of Nevada ranged from small porpoise size (Mixosaurs), to whale sized (Shonisaurs).

While Nevada’s central and northern regions lay beneath ancient seas, its southern territory extended to the continental margin. Consequently, southern Nevada showcases extensive exposures of geological formations common to other Southwestern states. The oldest of these is the Moenkopi Formation, which recently produced the oldest Mesozoic vertebrate tracks from the state of Nevada. Overlying the Moenkopi Fm is the Chinle Fm, which has produced some isolated Phytosaur teeth from the Muddy Mountains, some associated bones of Metoposaurs from the Spring Mountains, and abundant petrified wood where ever else it is exposed. These unit record the transition from tidal flats to swamping fluvial environments in southern Nevada during the Triassic.

== History ==
=== Indigenous interpretations ===
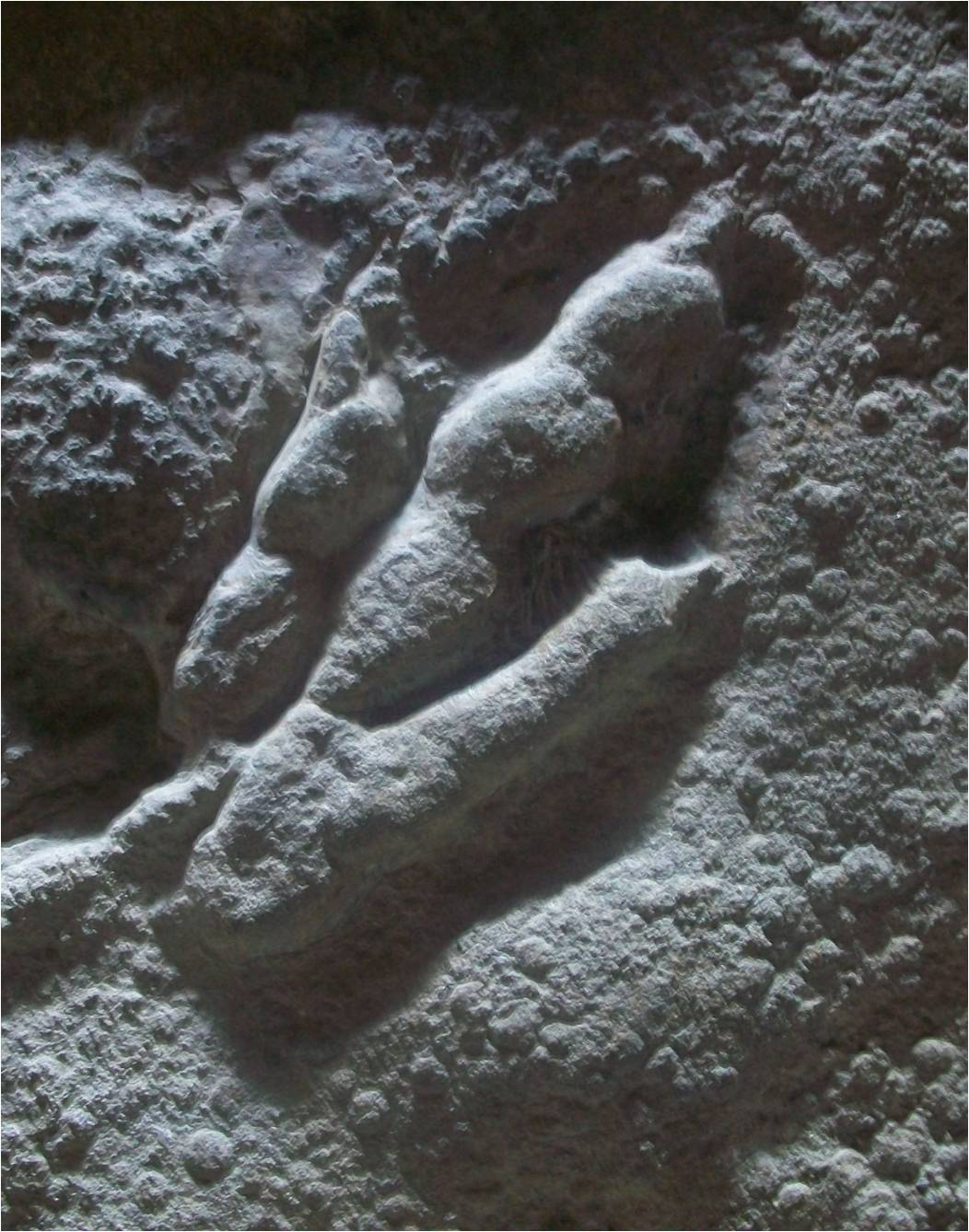
Dinosaur footprint.

The Paiute people of northwestern Nevada believe that the region around Lovelock was once home to a race of red haired cannibals they called the Si-Teh-Cahs. The ancestral Paiutes supposedly killed the Si-Teh-Cahs by trapping them in Lovelock Cave and lighting a huge fire to smother them with the smoke. When the Paiutes returned to the cave, it smelt of their burnt remains. Some of the details in the story correspond with the physical details of Lovelock cave. The cave does preserve evidence for ancient fires and the cave's deep bat guano smells comparable to burnt human remains. Red-haired human mummies were also found in the cave. These were promoted by some as being giants, but at least some versions of the story of the Si-Teh-Cahs portray them as normal sized. The human remains that have been confirmed from Lovelock Cave were within normal size parameters. Nevertheless, it's possible that some versions of the Paiute legend of the Si-Teh-Cahs described them as giants based on the limb bones of cave bears and mammoths, which are both human-like and common in the Black Rock Desert Area. The depiction of the Si-Teh-Cahs as red-haired likely derives from the red hair of the mummies, that darkly colored hair contains unstable pigments that break down over time leaving the hair a reddish color. This belief may have been influenced by the 2,000-year-old human mummies in the cave and the cave bear and mammoth fossils found north of Lovelock Cave.

There is additional evidence for knowledge of fossils among local indigenous peoples. The Paiute and Ute people of Nevada were aware of dinosaur footprints in addition to their fossil-derived myths about the Si-Teh-Cahs. Fossil teratorn remains found in Nevada may have helped inspire other local beliefs in monstrous birds.

=== Scientific research ===
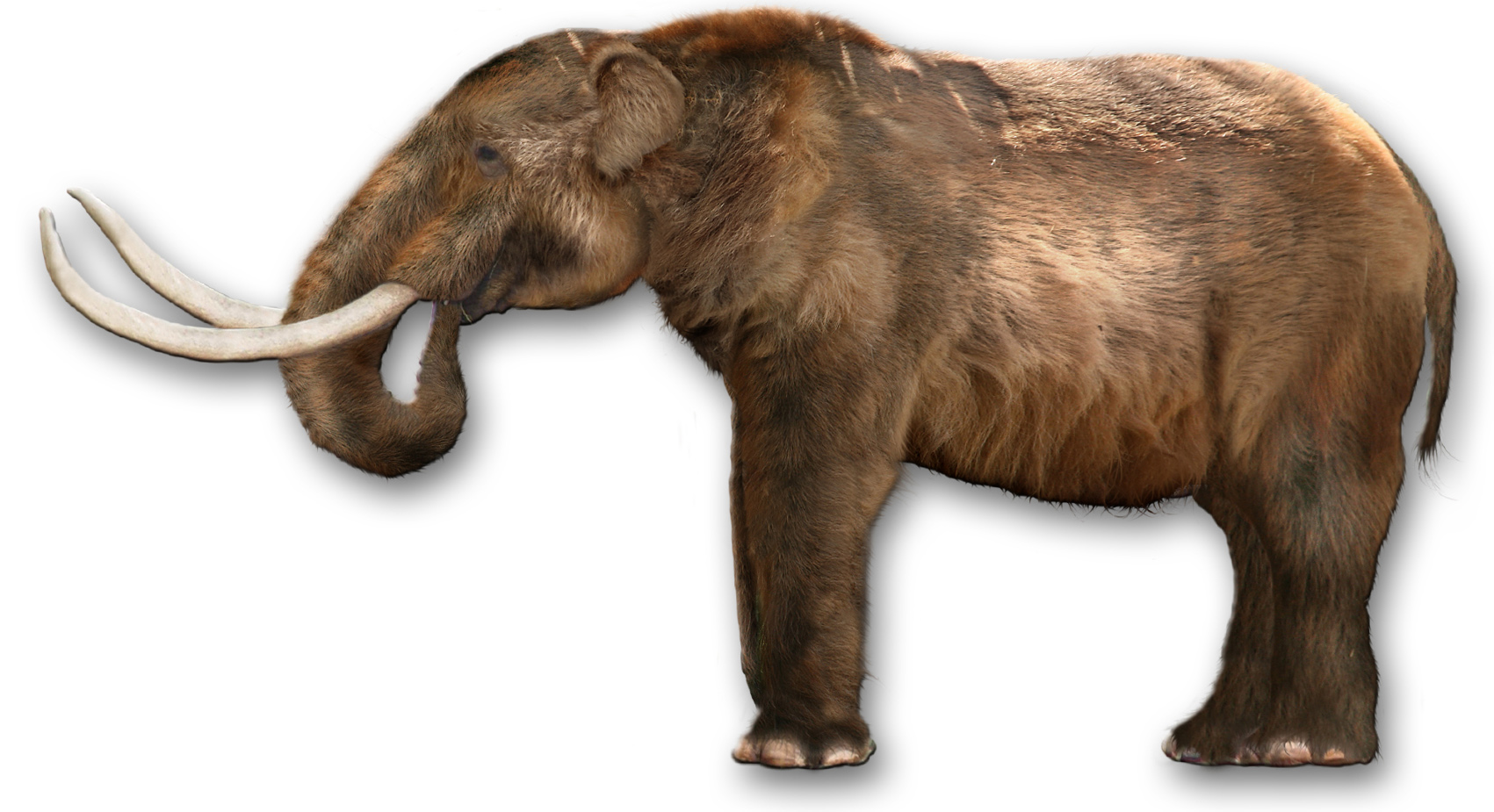
Mastodon

The first serious paleontological field work in Nevada prospected for fossils in the Eureka area. Their field site was perched at an altitude of 6,000 feet and lay between the basins of Lake Bonneville and Lake Lahontan. Excavators discovered more than 500 kinds of Paleozoic invertebrates from the Cambrian, Devonian, and Carboniferous periods. Most of the animals uncovered were freshwater mollusks. A significant proportion were previously unknown to science. Another significant early fossil discovery in Nevada happened entirely serendipitously. Around the time of the Gold Rush, the jail in Carson City needed more room. The sandstone walls were blasted to create material for constructing a workshop. The blasting revealed a variety of fossil footprints. In 1882 paleontologists from the National Academy of Sciences identified the tracks as belonging to Pleistocene creatures like assorted birds, horses, American lions, mastodons, giant ground sloths, and dire wolves.

Early in 1900 a new Nevada fossil site was discovered in the Virgin Valley. The site bore three fossil rich horizons. The lower and upper layers were rich in animal remains like two relatives of modern camels, a large cat, two different kinds of horse, remains likely belonging to a rhinoceros, and mastodons. Between the animal-bearing layer was a deposit rich in plant material like leaves, logs, and stems. In 1908 more discoveries were made in the Virgin Valley area in beds being exploited for opal. There naturally occurring casts of twigs, limbs, and cracks of petrified wood were found. In 1912 a slab of rock preserving fish, a primitive horse, mollusks, and plants, near Esmeralda Field. In 1914, Miocene fossils of creatures like freshwater mollusks, mastodons, and rhinoceros were found in the Kawich Mountains northeast of Las Vegas. The site is now known as the Truckie Beds. In 1930 M. R. Harrington was searching for Pueblo Indian pottery when he serendipitously discovered the skull of a ground sloth in Gypsum Cave in southern Nevada. Harrington later returned to the site and uncovered more of the sloth's bones.

In 1933, the Tule Springs Expedition, led by Fenley Hunter, was the first major effort to explore the archaeological importance of the area surrounding Tule Springs. The Tule Springs Archaeological Site contains ground sloths, mammoths, prehistoric horses and American camels and the first giant condors in Nevada.

== Natural history museums and museums with significant Nevada Fossils ==
- Las Vegas Natural History Museum, Las Vegas
- Nevada State Museum, Carson City,
- W.M. Keck Earth Science and Mineral Engineering Museum, Reno, Nevada
- Northeastern Nevada Museum, Elko, Nevada
- Nevada State Museum, Las Vegas,
- University of California Museum of Paleontology, Berkeley, California

== Fossil Parks in Nevada ==
- Berlin-Ichthyosaur State Park
- Ice Age Fossils State Park
- Tule Springs Fossil Beds National Monument

== See also ==
- Paleontology in Arizona
- Paleontology in California
- Paleontology in Idaho
- Paleontology in Oregon
