= 1998 United States House of Representatives elections in Idaho =

- November 3, 1998

All 2 Idaho seats to the United States House of Representatives
	Majority party	Minority party
Party	Republican	Democratic
Last election	2	0
Seats won	2	0
Seat change	Steady	Steady
Popular vote	204,568	169,389
Percentage	54.00%	44.71%

The 1998 United States House of Representatives elections in Idaho were held on November 3, 1998, to elect the state of Idaho's two members to the United States House of Representatives.

== Overview ==
1998 United States House of Representatives elections in Idaho
Party	Votes	Percentage	Seats	+/–
Republican	204,568	54.00%	2	Steady
Democratic	169,389	44.71%	0	Steady
Natural Law	4,854	1.28%	0	—
Write-ins	18	0.00%	0	—
Totals	378,829	100.00%	2	—

== District 1 ==
Incumbent Republican Congresswoman Helen Chenoweth ran for re-election to a third term. She defeated farmer Jim Pratt in the Republican primary by a wide margin, winning 71 percent of the vote. In the general election, she faced Democratic nominee Dan Williams, in a rematch of their 1996race. While Chenoweth only narrowly defeated Williams in 1996, she won by a wider margin the second time, receiving 55 percent of the vote to Williams's 45 percent.

=== Republican primary ===
==== Candidates ====
- Helen Chenoweth, incumbent U.S. Representative
- Jim Pratt, farmer

==== Results ====
Republican primary results
Party	Candidate	Votes	%
Republican	Helen Chenoweth (inc.)	43,941	71.02%
Republican	Jim Pratt	17,926	28.98%
Total votes		61,867	100.00%

=== Democratic primary ===
==== Candidates ====
- Dan Williams, attorney, 1996 Democratic nominee for Congress
- Leif Skyving, comedian (write-in)

==== Results ====
Democratic primary results
Party	Candidate	Votes	%
Democratic	Dan Williams	16,338	99.98%
Democratic	Leif Skyving (write-in)	4	0.02%
Total votes		16,342	100.00%

=== General election ===
==== Candidates ====
- Helen Chenoweth (Republican)
- Dan Williams (Democratic)

==== Polling ====
Poll source	Date(s)	Sample size	Margin of error	Helen Chenoweth (R)	Dan Williams (D)	Other / undecided (Note: Calculated by taking the difference of 100% and all other candidates combined.)
Garin-Hart-Yang Research Group (D) (Note: Poll conducted for an unspecified Democratic sponsor.)	October 13, 1998	372	—	42%	44%	14%

==== Results ====
1998 Idaho's 1st congressional district general election results
Party	Candidate	Votes	%
Republican	Helen Chenoweth (inc.)	113,231	55.30%
Democratic	Dan Williams	91,653	44.70%
Total votes		204,884	100.00%
Republican hold			

== District 2 ==
Republican Congressman Mike Crapo opted to run for the United States Senate rather than seek re-election. Mike Simpson, the Speaker of the Idaho House of Representatives, narrowly won the Republican primary to succeed Crapo, winning 40 percent of the vote to State Representative Mark Stubbs's 35 percent. In the general election, he was challenged by former Congressman Richard H. Stallings, the Democratic nominee.

=== Republican primary ===
==== Candidates ====
- Mike Simpson, Speaker of the Idaho House of Representatives
- Mark Stubbs, State Representative
- Dane Watkins, former State Senator
- Ann Rydalch, former State Senator

==== Results ====
Republican primary results
Party	Candidate	Votes	%
Republican	Mike Simpson	26,620	40.39%
Republican	Mark Stubbs	23,336	35.41%
Republican	Dane Watkins	9,100	13.81%
Republican	Ann Rydalch	6,844	10.39%
Total votes		65,900	100.00%

=== Democratic primary ===
==== Candidates ====
- Richard H. Stallings, former U.S. Representative, 1992 Democratic nominee for the U.S. Senate

==== Results ====
Democratic primary results
Party	Candidate	Votes	%
Democratic	Richard H. Stallings	11,062	100.00%
Total votes		11,062	100.00%

=== General election ===
==== Candidates ====
- Mike Simpson (Republican)
- Richard H. Stallings (Democratic)
- Jonathan B. Ratner (Natural Law)

==== Polling ====
Poll source	Date(s)	Sample size	Margin of error	Mike Simpson (R)	Richard Stallings (D)	Other / undecided
Garin-Hart-Yang Research Group (D)	October 13, 1998	400	—	36%	42%	22%

==== Results ====
1998 Idaho's 2nd congressional district general election results
Party	Candidate	Votes	%
Republican	Mike Simpson	91,337	52.51%
Democratic	Richard H. Stallings	77,736	44.69%
Natural Law	Jonathan B. Ratner	4,854	2.79%
Write-ins		18	0.01%
Total votes		173,945	100.00%
Republican hold			

== See also ==
- 1998 United States House of Representatives elections
