= Efforts to impeach Joe Biden =

Attempts by Republicans to impeach the 46th United States president

Former U.S. President Joe Biden saw multiple efforts by some members of the Republican Party to impeach him. An impeachment inquiry into Biden was launched in September 2023, without a vote, by House Speaker Kevin McCarthy, who designated three House committees led by James Comer, chairman of House Committee on Oversight and Accountability. A number of prominent Republican lawmakers, along with Donald Trump and some of his political allies, have indicated the motivation behind efforts to impeach Biden is also driven by resentment over Trump's previous two impeachments.

There has often been a lack of consensus among supporters of impeachment as to what the root offenses for an impeachment should be. Issues that have been floated by prominent proponents have included Biden's handling of illegal immigration at the United States–Mexico border, the handling of the United States' withdrawal of troops from Afghanistan, Biden's extension of a federal COVID-19 eviction moratorium, other COVID-19 pandemic-related actions of Biden, business dealings of Biden's son Hunter (incorporating allegations of the Biden–Ukraine conspiracy theory), Biden's energy policy, the Joe Biden classified documents incident, and the accusation that Biden was "weaponizing" the government.

During the Democratic-controlled 117th United States Congress, Republican members submitted nine resolutions to impeach Biden, although expressed support for these resolutions was limited among Republicans in the United States House of Representatives, as none of these resolutions had more than seven cosponsors, and a number had no cosponsors. More than half of the resolutions were submitted by Congresswoman Marjorie Taylor Greene, who submitted the first impeachment resolution on the first full day of Biden's presidency. Ahead of the 2022 United States House of Representatives elections, many news outlets predicted that impeachment might receive high priority from House Republicans if they retook the majority. However, after Republicans won a much weaker majority than many had predicted they would, many news outlets expected that the prospects of an impeachment were less likely. Several resolutions to impeach were introduced in the Republican-majority 118th United States Congress, but these did not advance beyond committee and have received very few co-sponsors.

On July 24, 2023, Republican Speaker of the House Kevin McCarthy stated that he saw House investigations into Biden as likely to justify a future impeachment inquiry. McCarthy launched such an inquiry on September 12, 2023, doing so without holding a House vote. There were also differing degrees of efforts to impeach other Biden administration officials, including Vice President Kamala Harris, Secretary of Homeland Security Alejandro Mayorkas, and Secretary of State Antony Blinken. Secretary Mayorkas was impeached in February 2024.

Despite neither the earlier Comer committee investigation nor the impeachment inquiry finding evidence of wrongdoing by the president, on December 13, 2023, the United States House of Representatives voted 221–212, along party lines, to approve a resolution that formalized the inquiry. By March 2024 the impeachment inquiry was winding down, having found no evidence to proceed.

== Background ==
A desire to impeach Biden was expressed by a number of influential members of the opposition Republican Party.

Some analysts have observed that, due to the two impeachments that Donald Trump faced in his presidency, he and many in the Republican Party have a desire to exact revenge on Democrats by impeaching a Democratic president.

Former president Trump publicly called several times after the start of the 118th Congress for the impeachment of Biden.

== Pre-inauguration support ==
Even before Biden won the Democratic Party's nomination in the 2020 United States presidential election, there was talk of how the Republican Party might impeach him if he became president. Joni Ernst, United States Senator from Iowa, in February 2020 remarked that the Biden–Ukraine conspiracy theory could be grounds for "impeachable whatever" if Biden were to become president.

Before Biden took office and shortly after the January 6, 2021 attack on the United States Capitol, Steve Bannon, the former chief strategist for Biden's predecessor Donald Trump, called for Biden to be impeached for "his illegitimate activities of stealing the presidency," referring to unfounded conspiracy theories which formed the basis of attempts by Trump and his allies to overturn the results of the 2020 presidential election.

== Developments during the 117th Congress ==
=== House developments during the 117th Congress ===
On January 21, 2021, the day after the inauguration of Joe Biden, Rep. Marjorie Taylor Greene (R-GA) filed an article of impeachment against President Biden. Her articles related to the Biden–Ukraine conspiracy theory. Greene alleged abuse of power while Biden previously served as vice president of the United States. Her article of impeachment claimed that Viktor Shokin was investigating the founder of Burisma Holdings, a natural gas giant in Ukraine. Biden's son Hunter Biden had served as a member of the board since 2014. However, Shokin was not investigating the company. There is no concrete evidence that suggests Biden had pressured Ukraine to benefit his son. The day it was introduced, the article was referred to the House Committee on the Judiciary. On March 5, 2021, the article was referred to the Subcommittee on the Constitution, Civil Rights and Liberties. No further action has been taken on the article.

In June 2021, Donald Trump expressed interest in pursuing a scenario in which he would run for a House of Representatives seat in Florida in the 2022 House elections, get himself elected speaker of the House, and then launch an impeachment inquiry into President Biden.

Following the withdrawal of American military forces from Afghanistan, the Fall of Kabul on August 15, 2021, and the subsequent attack on Kabul's airport, several Republicans, including Representatives Greene, Lauren Boebert, and Ronny Jackson, called for either the stripping of Biden's powers and duties via the 25th Amendment or removal of Biden from office via impeachment if Americans and allies were left behind and held hostage in Afghanistan by the Taliban. House Minority Leader Kevin McCarthy pledged a “day of reckoning” against Biden. There were also Republican calls for Vice President Kamala Harris and other Biden Cabinet officials to be impeached and removed as well.

On September 21, 2021, Republican Representative Bob Gibbs, with several cosponsors, introduced articles of impeachment related to the withdrawal from Afghanistan. Celine Castronuovo of The Hill opined that this resolution was not likely to fare better than Greene's previous impeachment resolution, but also that it demonstrated "how the introduction of articles of impeachment is becoming more common in today's polarized House". Also in September 2021, Republican Representative Lauren Boebert announced articles of impeachment against President Biden and Vice President Harris, charging them with failing "to ensure the national security of the United States and its citizens" in the withdrawal of the United States military from Afghanistan.

In March 2022, Republican Representative Jim Jordan stated in an interview with The Washington Times that he believed his party should discuss the possibility of impeaching Biden, and that illegal immigration might be one of reasons to impeach Biden, but that an impeachment might focus on another matter entirely.

In September 2022, Republican Representative Nancy Mace characterized there being "pressure on Republicans," to impeach Biden if they won control of the House. In August 2022, Mike Lillis of The Hill likened early calls for impeachment by right-wing conservatives in the Republican Party to the early efforts to impeach Donald Trump, noting that, after Democrats took the House majority in the 2018 House elections, early calls by liberals on the Democratic Party's left were regularly rejected by House Speaker Nancy Pelosi until after a whistleblower accused Trump of the acts that resulted in his first impeachment.

It was noted by analysts that Republican calls for impeachment lacked a consensus on what the grounds for impeachment would be. Reasons Republican House members have floated for why to impeach Biden had included the withdrawal of the United States military from Afghanistan, illegal immigration and border enforcement, Biden's extension of a federal pandemic eviction moratorium, and various acts of the Biden administration regarding the COVID-19 pandemic.

By September 2022, nine impeachment resolutions against Biden had been introduced. Representative Marjorie Taylor Greene had authored five of them. Many of those sponsoring and cosponsoring these resolutions were members of the right-wing House Freedom Caucus. Support for impeachment had been particularly prominent among congresspeople associated with the House Freedom Caucus. Reasons for impeachment cited by the nine resolutions varied. They included Biden's handling of illegal immigration at the United States-Mexico border, the handling of the United States' withdrawal from Afghanistan, the COVID-19 eviction moratorium, and Hunter Biden's business dealings. However, Oliver Knox of the Washington Post characterized the push to impeach Biden as "anemic" due to the fact that none of these had more than seven cosponsors, and some of them had no cosponsors. However, he also predicted that this could change if Republicans won a majority in the House of Representatives. He attributed the small support the resolutions had received, in part, to the fact that they would not likely amount to an impeachment while Democrats held majority control of the House of Representatives.

Ahead of the 2022 midterms, numerous prominent political analysts predicted that if the Republican Party won control of the House of Representatives for the 118th United States Congress, Biden might be impeached, as might other Biden administration officials such as Vice President Kamala Harris, Attorney General Merrick Garland, Secretary of Homeland Security Alejandro Mayorkas, and Secretary of State Antony Blinken, all of whom many House Republicans had expressed an open interest in impeaching. In addition to the nine articles of impeachment introduced against Biden by September 2022, by this time five other impeachment resolutions had been introduced against other members of his administration: two being against Attorney General Garland and the other three being against Vice President Harris, Secretary of State Blinken, and Secretary of Homeland Security Mayorkas. Discussions in Republican circles had also taken place before the midterms about the possibility of impeaching of Secretary of Education Miguel Cardona. Congressman David Schweikert had also proposed the idea of impeaching FBI Director Chris Wray.

Outlets such as The Hill predicated that an impeachment of Biden would be "a top priority" for House Republicans if they won control of the House of Representatives in the 2022 midterm elections. In early September 2022, a Rasmussen Reports poll found 52% of likely midterm voters to support impeachment. Shortly before the 2022 midterm elections, another Rasmussen Reports poll indicated that 54% of likely voters expected that, if Republicans won control of the House of Representatives, a Republican House would impeach Biden. The Biden administration even took steps that were potentially in preparation for investigations under a Republican congress, such as staffing a legal counsel office. As the election neared, many top members of the Republican Party, including House Minority Leader Kevin McCarthy, attempted to downplay discussion of impeaching Biden, perhaps fearing that it might put-off some voters.

After Republicans underperformed expectations in the midterm election and only won a very-narrow majority in the House of Representatives, some analysts began to express the belief that impeachment was less likely. However, it was still expected that other investigations into Biden and the Biden administrations would occur. Indeed, after their party secured a narrow majority in the House of Representatives, many leading Republicans expressed that investigations into Biden's presidential administration and into the business dealings of his son Hunter would be among their top priorities. Even after the party's underperformance in the midterm elections, many of the Donald Trump-aligned segment of the party's voter base of the Republican Party, as well as a number of congress members, continued pressuring House Republicans to pursue an impeachment of either Biden or a member of his presidential administration. A number of Republicans elected to the House publicly expressed reluctance to pursue an impeachment of Biden. A number of Senate Republicans also signaled their disinterest in seeing an impeachment of either Biden or a member of Biden's administration. On November 9, 2022, Biden commented on House Republican calls for investigations and impeachment, calling it, "almost comedy".

Following the Viktor Bout–Brittney Griner prisoner exchange on December 8, 2022, Congresswoman Marjorie Taylor Greene cited the exchange as another grounds upon which she believed that Biden should be impeached.

=== Opinions of Republican senators during the 117th Congress ===
In January 2022, Republican Senator Ted Cruz of Texas predicted that if Republicans won control of the U.S. House of Representatives in the 2022 House of Representatives elections they would likely to move to impeach Biden "whether it's justified or not". Hinting at retribution for the impeachments of Biden's Republican predecessor Donald Trump, Cruz used the figure of speech, "what's good for the goose is good for the gander." Cruz speculated that matters concerning the United States border with Mexico would likely be the best grounds for impeachment.

In August 2021, after the withdrawal of the U.S. military forces from Afghanistan and the Fall of Kabul, Senators Rick Scott and Lindsey Graham were prominent among Republican voices calling for Biden to either be stripped of his powers and duties via the 25th Amendment or removed through impeachment if any Americans or allies were to be left behind and held hostage in Afghanistan by the Taliban. Additionally, at this time, Republican Senators Josh Hawley and Marsha Blackburn, called for Biden, Vice President Kamala Harris and Biden Cabinet officials to be removed through impeachment. Mitch McConnell did not call for an impeachment inquiry into Biden, however, as Republicans did not have the majority in either the House or Senate.

=== Outside opinions during the 117th Congress ===
A Morning Consult poll in mid-November 2022 found that only 28% of Americans supporting having an impeachment investigation or investigations into Hunter Biden's business dealings be a top congressional priority, though it also found more than half of self-identified Republicans supported it as a top congressional priority. Overall, 39% of Americans supported impeachment being an important priority of any degree, while 43% opposed impeachment.

Andrew C. McCarthy of the National Review wrote a late-December 2022 op-ed arguing for Biden to be impeached over his policies in regard to the United States–Mexico border.

== Developments during the 118th Congress prior to launch of inquiry ==
=== House developments ===
On January 2, 2023, the day before the start of the 118th United States Congress, Representative Marjorie Taylor Greene continued to promote the prospect of impeachment. On January 7, 2023, Representative Byron Donalds declared his belief that an impeachment process against Biden is, "something that will happen." Representative Chip Roy also affirmed his desire to see an impeachment of Biden during the first days of the new Congress. On January 10, 2023, after news broke that a number of evidently-classified documents from Biden's tenure as vice president had been found at the Penn Biden Center for Diplomacy and Global Engagement (marking the start of the Joe Biden classified documents incident), Representative Greene cited this as a reason to impeach Biden. In the early weeks of the 118th Congress, Democratic House Minority Leader Hakeem Jeffries characterized Republicans as poised to spend the 118th Congress focusing on, "impeachment and investigation...[and] witch hunts," instead of focusing on concerns important to "working families".

Several Republicans that had, in the 117th Congress, supported legislation to impeach Biden have been chosen by the House Republican Caucus to be on the House Oversight Committee, including Lauren Boebert and Marjorie Taylor Greene.

By the start of May 2023, no articles of impeachment had been introduced in the 118th congress to impeach Biden. On May 3, 2023, Congresswoman Marjorie Taylor Greene, claimed that she had evidence sufficient to impeach Biden and predicted that he would ultimately face impeachment. Greene also pushed for the impeachment of other Biden officials. announced plans in mid-May to introduce articles of impeachment against FBI Director Christopher A. Wray and U.S. Attorney Matthew M. Graves. On May 18, 2023, Greene announced that she planned to again introduce articles of impeachment against Biden, citing his handling of border security at the United States-Mexico border. Green introduced her resolution on May 18, 2023, marking the first impeachment resolution against Biden to be introduced in the 118th Congress. The same day she also introduced impeachment resolutions against Wray and Graves, as well as against Attorney General Garland and Secretary of Homeland Security Mayorkas. Several other Republican congress members have introduced impeachment resolutions since then.

Speaker Kevin McCarthy was reported to have, in a late-June 2023 closed-door meeting with the Republican caucus, urged the Republican caucus to vote against authorizing impeachment amid an effort by Congresswoman Lauren Boebert to force the House to vote on impeaching Biden by introducing a privileged resolution to impeach Biden. McCarthy, who had previously expressed his belief that there were no apparent grounds yet on which to impeach Biden, was reported to have considered it to be an incorrect time to attempt to impeach Biden and to have urged the Republican caucus to instead refer Boebert's articles of impeachment to committee. McCarthy commented to reporters that an impeachment of Biden would not be "the right thing to do," remarking that impeachment, "is one of the most serious things you can do as a member of Congress," and that, "I think you've got to go through the process. You've got to have the investigation, and throwing something on the floor actually harms the investigation that we're doing right now." The House voted to refer Boebert's proposed articles of impeachment to both the House Homeland Security Committee and the House Judiciary Committee. A number of Republican congresspeople at the time commented that a potential impeachment of Biden would serve as a retaliation for the impeachments of Donald Trump.

On July 25, 2023, Speaker McCarthy commented in an interview with Sean Hannity that he believed that House investigations into Biden would eventually lead to an impeachment inquiry, saying, "this is rising to the level of impeachment inquiry, which provides Congress the strongest power to get the rest of the knowledge and information needed." McCarthy cited allegations of the past business dealings of Biden's son, Hunter, and also cited a characterization that Biden was "weaponiz[ing] government to benefit his family and deny Congress the ability to have the oversight." McCarthy claimed the next day that impeachment inquiry would be necessary for certain avenues of impeachment, claiming it would increase^{α} the subpoena powers of House investigation into Biden.

McCarthy said on September 1 that he would not initiate an impeachment inquiry without a full House vote. As the House returned from its summer recess on September 12, impeachment considerations were complicated by the need to approve the fiscal 2024 federal budget by the end of the month or else shutting down the government. Conservative hardliners said they would withhold their votes to open an impeachment inquiry unless there were deep spending cuts. McCarthy said a government shutdown would halt House investigations into the Bidens. An impeachment inquiry vote could not pass if more than four Republicans voted against it, and eighteen Republicans represented districts Biden won in 2020; Time reported on September 8 that nearly twenty Republicans opposed an inquiry. A number of moderate Republican members of the House openly voiced opposition to a prospective impeachment inquiry. Additionally Ken Buck, a conservative House member who is a member of the House Freedom Caucus, criticized the push for impeachment. Nancy Mace, a Republican member of the House committee investigating the Bidens, warned an impeachment proceeding could cost Republicans their House majority. McCarthy announced on September 12 that he was directing the Oversight, Judiciary and Ways and Means committees to begin an impeachment inquiry, to be led by congressman James Comer, chairman of the Oversight Committee. McCarthy did not mention whether a full House vote might be held.

The Washington Post reported that during a November 7 luncheon with the Republican Governance Group, McCarthy's successor Mike Johnson indicated there was insufficient evidence to initiate formal impeachment proceedings. Johnson said on December 2 that he believed he had enough House votes to continue to impeachment proceedings, as Republicans said a vote might be held within days, though they acknowledged they had not found evidence of misconduct by the president. In mid-December 2023 the House officially voted along party lines, with a Republican majority, in favor of authorizing the impeachment inquiry which began in September of that year.

=== Positions of Republican senators ===
When asked in January 2023, Republican Senator John Cornyn told reporters that he did not believe that the Joe Biden classified documents incident rose to an impeachable offense.

In May 2023, Republican Senator Ron Johnson voiced opposition to the idea of impeaching Biden. While Johnson expressed support for impeaching other Biden administration officials, he argued that another presidential impeachment would not be "healthy" for the United States, especially in light of the reality that a conviction in the United States Senate would be highly unlikely. Johnson remarked, "Honestly, we have to stop this impeaching every president, you know, the back and forth. It’s not healthy for our system." However, Johnson still expressed a willingness to vote to convict Biden if the House were to impeach him, remarking, "I would do anything to get rid of Joe Biden...in a legal process."

In June 2023, amid Congresswoman Lauren Boebert's effort to force a vote on impeachment, Senator John Cornyn remarked on the prospect of removing Biden from office through an impeachment process, "I know people are angry. I’m angry at the Biden administration for their policies at the border and a whole host of other things, but I think we also need to look at what’s achievable, and with a Democratic majority in the Senate, I don’t think that’s achievable." Senator Cornyn also opined that impeachment of presidents was become a routine action, blaming Democrats for their impeachments of Trump, commenting "unfortunately, what goes around, comes around."

In July 2023, after House Speaker McCarthy floated the possibility of a future impeachment inquiry, several Republican senators expressed their disinterest in an impeachment process and desire for the congress to instead focus on other matters. These included Senate Republican Whip John Thune and Senate Republican Policy Committee Chairwoman Joni Ernst. Senator Thune commented, "I'll say what I said before, and that is I think the best way to change the presidency is win the election... I think it's in our best interest to be making an argument for why we need to have the majority in the House, the Senate and the White House come January 2025."

Expressing reservations about an impeachment, Thom Tillis remarked, "I'll wait to see what evidence they present, got to do the homework. They cheapened the process the last two impeachments, and we don't want to repeat that mistake." While expressing concerns about president Biden and Hunter Biden, John Kennedy, expressed that he would disapprove of an impeachment if it were centered upon mere political disagreements. Kennedy remarked that an impeachment should need, "substantial evidence that the president has committed a high crime or misdemeanor," saying that nobody should be impeached in the absence of such evidence. Republican Senator John Cornyn opined that some of what he believed House investigators had shown regarding Hunter Biden's business dealings was concerning, but warned that lowering the threshold for impeachment would set unhealthy precedent.

While support for impeachment among Republican senators was weak, some Republican senators supported a possible inquiry, with Kevin Cramer opining that he believed that House investigations had demonstrated "pretty strong evidence of serious crimes". Senator Josh Hawley agreed with Speaker McCarthy that an impeachment inquiry likely would be needed in order to advance investigations into Biden.

Republican Senator Mitt Romney claimed that some of the matters that supporters of impeachment were citing appeared to be attacks intended to tarnish Biden ahead of his reelection effort in the 2024 presidential election, comparing it to attacks made on himself when he was the Republican Party's presidential nominee in the 2012 presidential election. Romney remarked, "There are all sorts of accusations and allegations. I had something of that nature launched against me when I was running for president." Romney opined that nothing meeting the constitutional bar of "high crimes and misdemeanors" had been raised against Biden, commenting, “[High crimes and misdemeanors have not] been alleged at this stage, but we'll see what develops."

=== Outside opinions ===
Shortly after the 118th Congress began, Republican former Representative Bob Barr, who in the 1990s had been a leading advocate of efforts to impeach then-president Bill Clinton (a Democrat), described the push to impeach Biden and other Biden administration officials as an "overreaction". Barr characterized impeachments as having become "devalued" into a "political tool", which he argued was a "misuse of impeachment". Barr urged caution on the part of Republicans regarding the pursuit of impeachments, noting that Democrats controlled the United States Senate. He instead encouraged using House committees to investigate aspects of the government.

== Impeachment inquiry ==
House Speaker Kevin McCarthy announces impeachment inquiry against Biden, Sept. 12, 2023.

On September 1, 2023, McCarthy promised in an interview with Breitbart News that he would hold a floor vote on opening an impeachment inquiry into President Biden. Eleven days later (on September 12, 2023), he directed three House committees to open a formal impeachment inquiry; McCarthy did not mention holding a floor vote. He did not appear to have sufficient Republican support to pass a floor vote.

The inquiry was launched despite the House investigation into Biden and his family not having found evidence of wrongdoing by the president. The launch of the impeachment inquiry has been seen by analysts as potentially being an effort by McCarthy to satisfy hardline right-wing members of the House's narrow Republican majority and avoid a motion to vacate the speakership. It came ahead of tenuous negotiations McCarthy had with his caucus ahead of the deadline to pass a federal budget and avert a government shutdown. Lacking evidence and Republican appetite to proceed to impeachment hearings with their thin House majority, by March 2024 the impeachment inquiry was winding down.

== Summary of introduced impeachment resolutions ==
Seventeen impeachment resolutions have been introduced; six of which were authored by Congresswoman Marjorie Taylor Greene.

=== 117th Congress ===
Impeachment resolutions introduced in the 117th U.S. Congress
Resolution #	Date introduced	Sponsor	Number of co-sponsors	Reason(s) given to impeach	Actions taken	Citation
H.Res.57	January 21, 2021	Marjorie Taylor Greene (R–GA)	1	Biden–Ukraine conspiracy theory	Referred to House Committee on the Judiciary on January 21, 2021; referred to the Subcommittee on the Constitution, Civil Rights, and Civil Liberties on March 5, 2021	
H.Res.596	August 23, 2021	Marjorie Taylor Greene (R–GA)	2	Biden's extension of the federal COVID-19 eviction moratorium	Referred to House Committee on the Judiciary on August 23, 2021	
H.Res.597	August 23, 2021	Marjorie Taylor Greene (R–GA)	5	Biden's handling of United States–Mexico border security	Referred to House Committee on the Judiciary on August 23, 2021	
H.Res.598	August 23, 2021	Marjorie Taylor Greene (R–GA)	7	Biden's handling of the withdrawal of United States troops from Afghanistan	Referred to House Committee on the Judiciary on August 23, 2021	
H.Res.635	September 10, 2021	Randy Weber (R–TX)	2	Biden's handling of the withdrawal of United States troops from Afghanistan	Referred to House Committee on the Judiciary on September 10, 2021	
H.Res.671	September 21, 2021	Bob Gibbs (R–OH)	3	Biden's handling of United States–Mexico border security, extension of the federal COVID-19 eviction moratorium, and handling of the withdrawal of United States troops from Afghanistan	Referred to House Committee on the Judiciary on September 21, 2021	
H.Res.680	September 24, 2021	Lauren Boebert (R–CO)	6	Biden's handling of the withdrawal of United States troops from Afghanistan	Referred to House Committee on the Judiciary on September 24, 2021	
H.Res.1031	April 5, 2022	Bill Posey (R–FL)	0	Biden's handling of United States-Mexico border security	Referred to House Committee on the Judiciary on April 5, 2022	
H.Res.1362	September 19, 2022	Marjorie Taylor Greene (R–GA)	0	"Endangering the energy security of the United States by selling oil from the U.S. Strategic Petroleum Reserve to foreign nations"	Referred to House Committee on the Judiciary on September 19, 2022	
H.Res.1532	December 27, 2022	Louie Gohmert (R–TX)	0	"Treason, and other high Crimes and Misdemeanors": Articles I, II, III, IV, V, VI, VII, VIII, IX, X, XI, XII: Biden's handling of the withdrawal of United States troops from Afghanistan; Article XIII: "Unlawfully and unconstitutionally" ordering air strikes in Syria; Article XIV: "Fail[ure] to respond to the growing nuclear and terrorist threats of Iran"; Article XV: "Treasonous" handling of immigration enforcement at the United States–Mexico border; Article XVI: "Transferring people with diseases including thousands of immigrants each month suffering from COVID–19 to undisclosed locations all over our country just as the Nation had been recovering from such pandemic"; Articles XVII, XVIII, XIX: Handling of United States–Mexico border security; Article XX: Various executive orders relating to energy policy and their alleged impacts on the United States' energy independence; Article XXI: Revocation of approval of the Keystone XL Pipeline; Article XXII: Initial revocation and later overturning of President Trump’s Executive Order 13920; Article XXIII: Putting "Americans in harm’s way by revoking President Donald J. Trump’s Executive Order 13942 that addressed the threat that TikTok posed to Americans"; Article XXIV: Biden's alleged handling of trade policy in regards to Chinese-owned Huawei; Article XXV: "Creating Executive orders that not only do not defend the Constitution as he swore, but show an intent to violate the Constitution and the rights it recognizes that belong to the American people" by "unconstitutionally legislating gun control restrictions by his orders"; Article XXVI: Acting to extend the COVID-19 pandemic eviction moratorium; Article XXVII: Biden–Ukraine conspiracy theory	Referred to House Committee on the Judiciary on December 27, 2022	

=== 118th Congress ===
Impeachment resolutions introduced in the 118th U.S. Congress
Resolution #	Date introduced	Sponsor	Number of co-sponsors	Reason(s) given to impeach	Actions taken	Citation
H.Res.420	May 18, 2023	Marjorie Taylor Greene (R–GA)	4	Biden's handling of United States–Mexico border security	Referred to the House Committee on the Judiciary on May 18, 2023	
H.Res.426	May 18, 2023	Bill Posey (R–FL)	1	Biden's handling of United States–Mexico border security	Referred to the House Committee on the Judiciary on May 18, 2023	
H.Res.493	June 12, 2023	Andy Ogles (R–TN)	3	Article 1: Having "weaponized the Executive Office of the President and his years of service in the White House, to include his service as Vice President, to shield the business and influence peddling schemes of his family from congressional oversight and public accountability." Article 2: Handling of United States–Mexico border security	Referred to the House Committee on the Judiciary on June 12, 2023	
H.Res.503	June 13, 2023	Lauren Boebert (R–CO)	4	"Abuse of power" and "dereliction of duty" in Biden's handling of United States-Mexico border security	Referred to the House Committee on Homeland Security and House Committee on the Judiciary on June 22, 2023 "for a period to be subsequently determined by the Speaker" (by a roll call vote of 219–208)	
H.Res.652	August 11, 2023	Greg Steube (R–FL)	1	Article I: "Abuse of power, bribery, Hobbs Act extortion, and honest services fraud" Article II: Obstruction of Congress; Article III: Fraud; Article IV: "Financial involvement in drug and prostitution activities"	Referred to the House Committee on the Judiciary on August 11, 2023	
H.Res.1220	May 10, 2024	Cory Mills (R–FL)	6	"Abuse of power" (purporting a "quid pro quo" for "corrupt purposes in pursuit of personal political benefit" involving withholding of weapons shipments to Israel)	Referred to the House Committee on the Judiciary on May 10, 2024	
H.Res.1319	June 25, 2024	Cory Mills (R–FL)	0	Article I: "Abuse of power" (purporting a "quid pro quo" for "corrupt purposes in pursuit of personal political benefit" involving withholding of weapons shipments to Israel); Article II: "Failure to faithfully execute laws" (relating to immigration and border policy); Article III: "Separation of powers" violations (relating to Federal Student Loan Debt Relief efforts)	Referred to the House Committee on the Judiciary on June 25, 2024	

== Opinion polling ==
=== Support for an impeachment ===
==== Polls during inquiry ====
Polling of support for an impeachment (during inquiry)
Poll source	Poll sponsor	Date(s) administered	Sample size	Margin of error	Support (Note: These polls are color-coded relative to the margin of error (×2 for spread). If the poll is within the doubled margin of error, both colors are used. If the margin of error is, for example, 2.5, then the spread would be 5, so a 50% support / 45% oppose would be tied.)	Oppose	Undecided
Monmouth University	—N/a	Sep. 19–24, 2022	814 adults	±4.5	34%	59%	

==== Pre-inquiry polls ====
Polling of support for an impeachment (pre-inquiry)
Poll source	Poll sponsor	Date(s) administered	Sample size	Margin of error	Support	Oppose	Undecided
Rasmussen Reports	—N/a	Aug. 31–Sep. 1, 2022	1,000 LV	±3	52%	42%	
GBAO/Fabrizio, Lee & Associates	The Wall Street Journal	Aug. 24–30, 2023	1,500 RV		43%	52%	—N/a

=== Support for the impeachment inquiry ===
Support for the impeachment inquiry
Poll source	Poll sponsor	Date(s) administered	Sample size	Margin of error	Support	Oppose	Undecided
Marist Poll	PBS and NPR	Sep. 25–28, 2023	1,137 registered voters	± 3.7	47%	51%	
Hart Research Associates/ Public Opinion Strategies	NBC News	Sep. 15–19, 2023	1,000 registered voters	± 3.1	39%	56%	5%

Support for the opening of the impeachment inquiry
Poll source	Poll sponsor	Date(s) administered	Sample size	Margin of error	Support	Oppose	Undecided
Ipsos	Reuters	Sep. 8–14, 2023	4,413 adults	± 2	41%	35%	24%
YouGov	—N/a	Sep. 13, 2023	3,943 adults		44%	41%	15%

== See also ==
Articles related to presidential impeachments and other efforts to impeach presidents of the United States:

- James Buchanan
  - Impeachment inquiry into James Buchanan
- Andrew Johnson
  - Efforts to impeach Andrew Johnson
  - First impeachment inquiry into Andrew Johnson
  - Second impeachment inquiry into Andrew Johnson
  - Impeachment of Andrew Johnson
  - Articles of impeachment adopted against Andrew Johnson
  - Impeachment trial of Andrew Johnson
  - 1868 impeachment managers investigation
  - Timeline of the impeachment of Andrew Johnson
- Richard Nixon
  - Impeachment process against Richard Nixon
- Bill Clinton
  - Efforts to impeach Bill Clinton
  - Impeachment inquiry into Bill Clinton
  - Impeachment of Bill Clinton
  - Impeachment trial of Bill Clinton
- George W. Bush
  - Efforts to impeach George W. Bush
- Barack Obama
  - Efforts to impeach Barack Obama
- Donald Trump
  - Efforts to impeach Donald Trump
  - Impeachment resolutions introduced against Donald Trump
  - Impeachment inquiry into Donald Trump
  - First impeachment of Donald Trump
  - First impeachment trial of Donald Trump
  - Second impeachment of Donald Trump
  - Second impeachment trial of Donald Trump
  - Proposed expungements of impeachments
- Impeachment of Alejandro Mayorkas

== Notes ==
^α While House standing committees have subpoena authority that can be comparable with those of impeachment inquiries, it is theoretically possible that impeachment inquiries might be seen by courts as having a greater "legislative purpose" than other congressional investigations to justify granting it access certain privileged materials. There are arguments that an impeachment inquiry has a greater need for specific factual information than traditional congressional investigations. There is also an argument that strong deference should be granted to impeachment inquiries against confidentiality interests of the executive branch of the federal government because impeachment is a constitutionally-specified means for addressing misconduct of federal officials and upholding the balance of the separation of powers. Whether courts agree with these arguments is undetermined since Federal courts have ruled very little on how executive privilege relates to conventional congressional investigations or impeachment inquiries and the Supreme Court of the United States has never addressed the application of executive privilege to materials being sought for an impeachment investigation.
