= Efforts to impeach Pete Hegseth =

Attempts to impeach U.S. Secretary of Defense Pete Hegseth

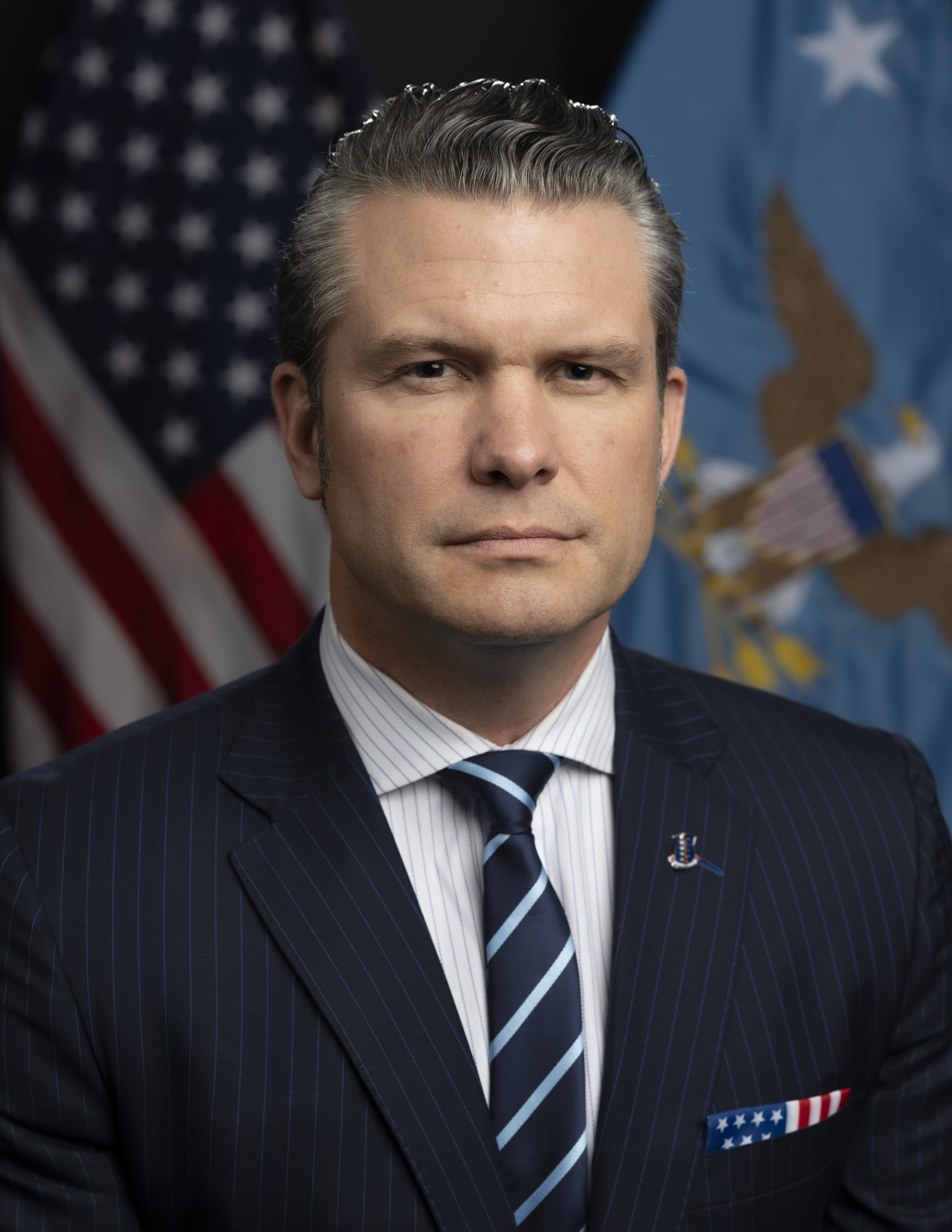
Pete Hegseth

During Pete Hegseth's tenure as United States Secretary of Defense in the second Trump administration, several efforts to impeach him have been made in the United States House of Representatives since December 2025. Resolutions containing articles of impeachment were introduced by Democratic representatives Shri Thanedar in December 2025 and Yassamin Ansari in April 2026, neither of which received a floor vote.

In September 2026, Republican representative Thomas Massie announced he would force a vote on eight articles of impeachment centered on the 2026 Iran war, but Speaker Mike Johnson sent the House into its pre-election recess early, delaying any vote. After Democrats won majorities in both chambers in the 2026 midterm elections, Massie reintroduced the articles on November 9, 2026, as a privileged resolution, requiring the House to act on it within two legislative days. On November 10, the House voted 211–204 to refer the resolution to the Judiciary Committee, effectively blocking a vote on the articles for the remainder of the 119th Congress. If impeached, Hegseth would be the third Cabinet secretary in U.S. history to be impeached, after William W. Belknap in 1876 and Alejandro Mayorkas in 2024.

== Background ==
Under Article II, Section 4 of the Constitution, civil officers of the United States, including Cabinet secretaries, may be removed from office on impeachment by a simple majority of the House and conviction by a two-thirds majority of the Senate. Two Cabinet secretaries have been impeached by the House, William W. Belknap in 1876 and Alejandro Mayorkas in 2024; neither was convicted by the Senate.

Hegseth was confirmed as Secretary of Defense in January 2025 after Vice President JD Vance broke a 50–50 tie in the Senate. Events cited in the impeachment resolutions include the discussion of planned military strikes in a Signal group chat in 2025, U.S. military strikes on vessels suspected of drug trafficking in the Caribbean Sea and eastern Pacific Ocean, the capture of Venezuelan president Nicolás Maduro in January 2026, and the war with Iran that began with U.S.–Israeli strikes in late February 2026.

== Earlier resolutions ==
=== Thanedar resolution ===
On December 9, 2025, Representative Shri Thanedar introduced H.Res. 935, containing two articles of impeachment. The first article, "Murder and Conspiracy to Murder", concerned a September 2, 2025, U.S. military strike on an alleged drug-smuggling boat off the coast of Venezuela; the resolution alleged that Hegseth ordered a follow-up strike that killed survivors of the initial attack. Hegseth denied the allegation. The second article, "Reckless and Unlawful Mishandling of Classified Information", concerned Hegseth's messages about planned strikes in Yemen in a Signal group chat that included Jeffrey Goldberg, the editor-in-chief of The Atlantic. The Pentagon's inspector general later concluded that Hegseth had risked endangering U.S. troops by sharing sensitive information on Signal.

Thanedar said the strikes amounted to "murder" and that the resolution "puts members of Congress on notice to take a stand." Pentagon spokesperson Kingsley Wilson called the effort "just another charade in an attempt to distract the American people". House Minority Leader Hakeem Jeffries said that "Republicans will never allow articles of impeachment to be brought to the floor". The resolution did not receive a vote.

=== Ansari resolution ===
On April 15, 2026, Representative Yassamin Ansari introduced H.Res. 1177, containing six articles of impeachment, with at least a dozen Democratic cosponsors, including Thanedar. The articles charged Hegseth with:

1. Unauthorized war against Iran and reckless endangerment of U.S. service members
2. Violations of the law of armed conflict and targeting of civilians
3. Negligence and reckless handling of sensitive military information
4. Obstruction of congressional oversight
5. Abuse of power and politicization of the armed forces
6. Conduct bringing disrepute upon the United States and its armed forces

The resolution cited civilian casualties, including the February 28 bombing of a school in Minab, Iran, as well as Hegseth's public remark "no quarter, no mercy for our enemies". Wilson called the effort "just another Democrat trying to make headlines". CBS News reported that, given the Republican majority, the resolution was almost certain not to advance; it did not receive a floor vote.

== Massie resolution ==
On September 15, 2026, Representative Thomas Massie, a member of the House Judiciary Committee, announced that he would force a House vote on eight articles of impeachment against Hegseth. Massie had lost the Republican primary for his seat in May 2026 to Ed Gallrein, a challenger endorsed by President Donald Trump.

Articles of impeachment in Massie's resolution
No.	Title in resolution	The article alleges that Hegseth…
I	"Waging War in Contravention of the War Powers Resolution of 1973 Section 2(c)"	began hostilities against Iran without a declaration of war, statutory authorization, an attack on the United States, or an imminent threat
II	"Waging War in Contravention of the War Powers Resolution of 1973 Section 5(c)"	continued hostilities after both houses of Congress directed the removal of forces through H. Con. Res. 86
III	"Waging War in Contravention of the War Powers Resolution of 1973 Section 5(b)"	continued hostilities beyond the 60-day termination period and 30-day withdrawal period
IV	"Ignoring Laws that Minimize Civilian Casualties"	disregarded legal requirements intended to limit harm to civilians
V	"Extrajudicial Killings"	unlawfully directed lethal strikes on suspected drug traffickers, citing at least 221 deaths (at least 243 in the November version), and mistreated survivors and shipwrecked persons
VI	"Suppressing Free Speech"	used Department of Defense authority to retaliate against Senator Mark Kelly for his speech
VII	"Kidnapping of a Sovereign Foreign Leader"	directed Operation Absolute Resolve to seize Nicolás Maduro and Cilia Flores in Venezuela without legal authority
VIII	"Unlawful War in Yemen"	conducted Operation Rough Rider in Yemen without authorization or an imminent threat

Article IV, titled "Ignoring Laws that Minimize Civilian Casualties", referred to the 28 February 2026, strike on Shajareh Tayyebeh Elementary School in Minab, Iran. It alleged that more than 200 civilians had been killed or injured as a result of Hegseth's leadership of the Department of Defense, which the resolution accused of dismantling safeguards established to limit civilian harm. It also argued that changes to the department's targeting procedures and legal review mechanisms had weakened protections intended to prevent civilian casualties and damage to non-military sites.

Massie said Hegseth was "abusing the power of his office to ignore congressional war powers resolutions" and that "Congress must not turn a blind eye". Because impeachment resolutions offered as a question of privilege must be acted upon within two legislative days, Massie's move threatened to force a vote before the midterm elections. On September 16, Speaker Mike Johnson announced that the House would begin its seven-week campaign recess a day early, which delayed any vote until after the midterm elections. Asked whether the early recess was meant to spare members a difficult vote, Johnson said it had nothing to do with Hegseth. He called the resolution "a publicity stunt by someone who wants attention" and said it would "immediately be tabled" when the House returned. Johnson also said that Hegseth had "done an extraordinary job". Massie objected to the adjournment on the House floor, saying, "I'm trying to stop a war." The previous day, Attorney General Todd Blanche had defended Hegseth, saying he "follows the law".

=== Reintroduction ===
First page of the resolution Massie read on the House floor on November 9, 2026

In the 2026 midterm elections, Democrats won majorities in both the House and Senate, effective January 3, 2027. Vice President Vance said the day after the election that "the reason we lost is the war".

On November 9, 2026, Massie read an updated, 34-page resolution, H.Res. 1655, with eight articles of impeachment on the House floor, restarting the two-legislative-day clock and setting up a vote expected by November 11. The resolution alleged that Hegseth "has demonstrated that he will remain a threat to the Constitution if allowed to remain in office". Massie described it as "a much gentler version" of what Democrats would pursue after taking control of the House in January.

Before the vote, Republicans held a 218–214 majority, meaning the resolution could pass with a small number of Republican votes if Democrats voted together. House Minority Leader Hakeem Jeffries said he was a "hard 'yes'". Representatives Adam Smith and Ro Khanna also pledged support. Some Republicans were undecided: Don Bacon said he was "wrestling" with the resolution, and French Hill said poor job performance did not by itself amount to an impeachable offense.

=== House vote ===
On November 10, 2026, the House voted 211–204 to refer the resolution to the Judiciary Committee, effectively blocking a vote on the articles for the remainder of the 119th Congress. The motion was supported by 210 Republicans and one independent; Massie was the only Republican to vote against it, joining all 203 Democrats who voted. Seven Republicans and eleven Democrats did not vote. According to CBS News, many Republicans were frustrated with Hegseth's handling of the Iran war but did not believe his conduct rose to the level of impeachment.

After the vote, Massie told reporters, "I wasn't surprised, but I was disappointed." Massie, who leaves office in January, had said he would not bring another impeachment resolution, and said he planned instead to force a vote on a war powers resolution. Jeffries, who is expected to become Speaker during the next Congress, said, "This is not the end of it. It's just the beginning."

=== Responses ===
Hegseth addressing Massie's impeachment efforts during a press conference on November 10, 2026

In a video posted to social media the week before the reintroduction, Hegseth said that "a disgruntled, defeated Congressman, along with all his Democrat allies, has also dropped sham articles of impeachment", adding that the effort "didn't work against President Trump, and it won't work with me." Pentagon spokesperson Sean Parnell said Hegseth would "not back down" and was "100% committed to leading the Department until the end of President Trump's term".

In an interview with 60 Minutes broadcast on November 8, Trump called the impeachment effort "very unfair" and said Hegseth was "guilty of two things: basically winning two wars", referring to the operations in Venezuela and Iran. He repeated this at a White House Press Conference, saying: "There's something wrong with Thomas Massie. [...] Pete Hegseth won two wars. [...] What about impeaching the gentleman from Biden, his person that disappeared for two weeks and nobody had any idea where he was? What about impeaching the people that ran the Vietnam War? What about impeaching [the people] that ran Iraq and Afghanistan?" The statement referenced his predecessor, President Joe Biden, whose Defence Secretary Lloyd Austin was hospitalised in January 2024 without disclosing his stay to Biden.

Responding to a question about the impeachment by Reuters about the fact the articles of impeachment came from a fellow Republican, Secretary of State Marco Rubio said: "I think it's unfair. I think Pete's done a good job. I really do."

At a news conference on November 10, Hegseth called the effort a "farce" and a "political spectacle", saying, "None of these are high crimes or misdemeanors." After the vote, Trump wrote on Truth Social that the effort had "miserably FAILED!"

=== Public opinion ===
An Economist/YouGov poll conducted September 18–21, 2026, found that 50% of American adults would support impeaching Hegseth "for starting a war with Iran without authorization by Congress", while 30% would oppose it. Democrats supported impeachment 77% to 14% and independents 50% to 22%, while Republicans opposed it 53% to 26%. Another YouGov poll conducted November 4–6, 2026 found that "42% of registered voters think Congress should impeach Hegseth and 35% think it should not; 23% are not sure".

== See also ==
- Pete Hegseth as Secretary of Defense
- List of impeachment investigations of United States federal officials
- Impeachment of Alejandro Mayorkas
- November 2025 United States military video controversy
- Efforts to impeach Donald Trump
