= Antelope Valley Limestone =

Lithostratigraphic unit

- Stratigraphic range: Ordovician Period
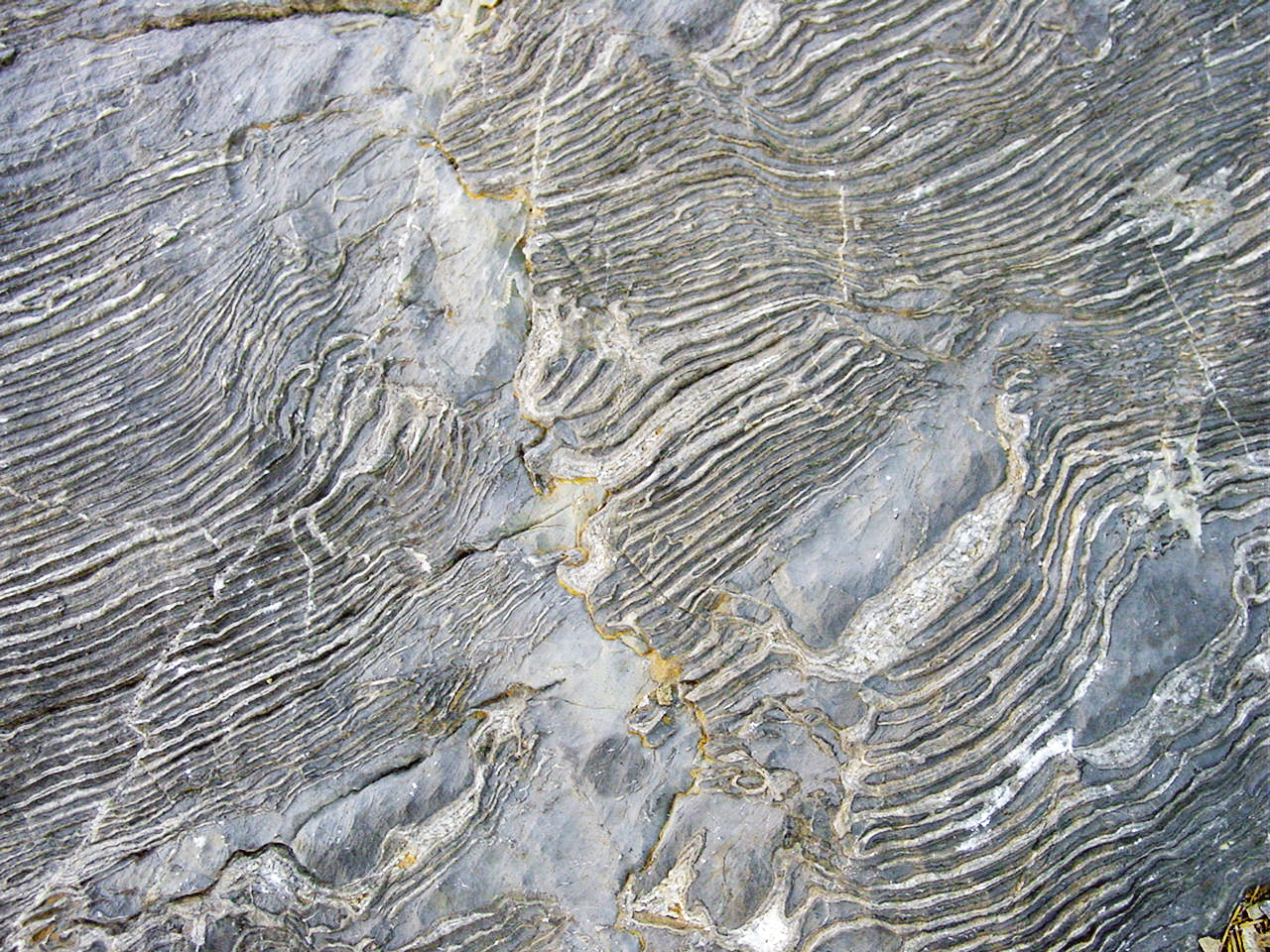
- Antelope Valley Limestone (Meiklejohn Peak, Nevada)
- Type: Geologic formation
- Unit of: Pogonip Group
- Underlies: Copenhagen Formation
- Overlies: Ninemile Formation
- Thickness: 1,100 feet (340 m)

Lithology
- Primary: Limestone

Location
- Region: Nevada
- Country: United States

Type section
- Named for: Antelope Valley (Nevada)

The Antelope Valley Limestone is a limestone geologic formation of the Pogonip Group in southern Nevada.

It is found in the Antelope Valley region of Eureka County and Nye County.

It preserves fossils dating back to the Whiterock Stage of the Ordovician period.

Funeralaspis, the oldest named odontopleurine trilobite, is known from the Dapingian sediments of this formation.

== See also ==
- List of fossiliferous stratigraphic units in Nevada
- Paleontology in Nevada
