= Antelope Valley (Nevada) =

Valley in Nevada, United States

Antelope Valley (aka "Dry Valley") in Nevada is "16.5 mi E of Monitor Valley and 10 mi S of Koben Valley, bounded on the W by Toiyabe National Forest, on the N by Bean Flat and Lone Mountain, on the E by the Mahogany Hills and White Cloud Peak, on the S by Horse Heaven Mountain and Ninemile Peak".
