= Windfall Formation =

Geologic formation in Nevada, US

- Stratigraphic range: Cambrian period
- Type: Formation
- Sub-units: Barton Canyon Member, Bullwhacker Member, Catlin Member
- Underlies: Pogonip Group, Goodwin Limestone
- Thickness: 300 feet (91 m) +

Location
- Region: Nevada
- Country: United States

The Windfall Formation is a geologic formation in northeastern and southern Nevada.

Areas it is found include the Antelope Valley region of Eureka County and Nye County.

It preserves fossils dating back to the Cambrian period.

== See also ==
- List of fossiliferous stratigraphic units in Nevada
- Paleontology in Nevada
