= Goodwin Limestone =

Geologic formation in Nevada, United States

- Stratigraphic range: Ordovician
- Type: Geologic formation
- Unit of: Pogonip Group
- Underlies: Ninemile Shale
- Overlies: Windfall Formation
- Thickness: 1,800 feet (550 m)

Location
- Region: Nevada
- Country: United States

The Goodwin Limestone is a geologic formation of the Pogonip Group in Nevada.

It preserves fossils dating back to the Ordovician period.

== See also ==
- List of fossiliferous stratigraphic units in California
- List of fossiliferous stratigraphic units in Nevada
