= 1996 United States House of Representatives elections in Idaho =

- November 5, 1996

All 2 Idaho seats to the United States House of Representatives
	Majority party	Minority party
Party	Republican	Democratic
Last election	2	0
Seats won	2	0
Seat change	Steady	Steady
Popular vote	289,990	193,524
Percentage	58.70%	39.17%

The 1996 United States House of Representatives elections in Idaho were held on November 5, 1996, to elect the state of Idaho's two members to the United States House of Representatives.

== Overview ==
1996 United States House of Representatives elections in Idaho
Party	Votes	Percentage	Seats	+/–
Republican	289,990	58.70%	2	Steady
Democratic	193,524	39.17%	0	Steady
Natural Law	10,512	2.13%	0	—
Totals	494,026	100.00%	2	—

== District 1 ==
Incumbent Republican Congresswoman Helen Chenoweth ran for re-election to a second term. She defeated physician William Levinger in the Republican primary with 68 percent of the vote and faced attorney Dan Williams, the Democratic nominee, in the general election. Chenoweth narrowly defeated Williams to win her second term, receiving 50 percent of the vote to his 48 percent.

=== Republican primary ===
==== Candidates ====
- Helen Chenoweth, incumbent U.S. Representative
- William A. Levinger, physician

==== Results ====
Republican primary results
Party	Candidate	Votes	%
Republican	Helen Chenoweth (inc.)	38,616	68.14%
Republican	William A. Levinger	18,054	31.86%
Total votes		56,670	100.00%

=== Democratic primary ===
==== Candidates ====
- Dan Williams, attorney
- Matt Alan Lambert, window washer

==== Results ====
Democratic primary results
Party	Candidate	Votes	%
Democratic	Dan Williams	15,396	81.07%
Democratic	Matt Alan Lambert	3,594	18.93%
Total votes		18,990	100.00%

=== General election ===
==== Candidates ====
- Helen Chenoweth (Republican)
- Dan Williams (Democratic)
- Marion Ellis (Natural Law)

==== Results ====
1996 Idaho's 1st congressional district general election results
Party	Candidate	Votes	%
Republican	Helen Chenoweth (inc.)	132,344	49.98%
Democratic	Dan Williams	125,899	47.55%
Natural Law	Marion Ellis	6,535	2.47%
Total votes		264,778	100.00%
Republican hold			

== District 2 ==
Incumbent Republican Congressman Mike Crapo ran for re-election to a third term. He defeated podiatrist Peter Rickards in the Republican primary, and faced homebuilder John Seidl, the Democratic nominee, in the general election. Crapo defeated Seidl by a wide margin, winning 69 percent of the vote to Seidl's 29 percent.

=== Republican primary ===
==== Candidates ====
- Mike Crapo, incumbent U.S. Representative
- Peter Rickards, podiatrist

==== Results ====
Republican primary results
Party	Candidate	Votes	%
Republican	Mike Crapo (inc.)	51,778	86.07%
Republican	Peter Rickards	8,382	13.93%
Total votes		60,160	100.00%

=== Democratic primary ===
==== Candidates ====
- John Seidl, homebuilder

==== Results ====
Democratic primary results
Party	Candidate	Votes	%
Democratic	John D. Seidl	13,876	100.00%
Total votes		13,876	100.00%

=== General election ===
==== Candidates ====
- Mike Crapo (Republican)
- John Seidl (Democratic)
- John Butler (Natural Law)

==== Results ====
1996 Idaho's 2nd congressional district general election results
Party	Candidate	Votes	%
Republican	Mike Crapo (inc.)	157,646	68.77%
Democratic	John Seidl	67,625	29.50%
Natural Law	John Butler	3,977	1.73%
Total votes		229,248	100.00%
Republican hold			

== See also ==
- 1996 United States House of Representatives elections
