= Pogonip Group =

Geologic group in the western U.S.

- Stratigraphic range: Early Ordovician stage Ordovician period
- Type: Geologic group
- Sub-units: Antelope Valley Limestone; Ninemile Formation; Goodwin Limestone
- Underlies: Copenhagen Formation
- Overlies: Windfall Formation

Location
- Region: Nevada; Utah
- Country: United States

Type section
- Named for: Pogonip Ridge, White Pine County, Nevada
- Named by: Clarence King

The Pogonip Group is an Ordovician period geologic group located in southern Nevada and in Utah.

== Geology ==
Its subunits in Nevada, from youngest/later to oldest/earlier, are:

- Goodwin Limestone — 1,800 metres (5,900 ft) thick
- Ninemile Formation — 550 metres (1,800 ft) thick
- Antelope Valley Limestone — 1,100 metres (3,600 ft) thick

It preserves fossils dating back to the Early Ordovician stage of the Ordovician period.

== See also ==
- List of fossiliferous stratigraphic units in Nevada
- List of fossiliferous stratigraphic units in Utah
