= Ninemile Formation =

Geologic formation in Nevada, United States

Ninemile Shale
- Stratigraphic range: Ordovician
- Type: Geologic formation
- Unit of: Pogonip Group
- Underlies: Antelope Valley Limestone
- Overlies: Goodwin Limestone
- Thickness: 550 ft (170 m)

Lithology
- Primary: Shale

Location
- Region: Nevada
- Country: United States

The Ninemile Shale is a geologic formation in Nevada. It preserves fossils dating back to the Ordovician period.

== See also ==
- List of fossiliferous stratigraphic units in Nevada
- Paleontology in Nevada
