= Impeachment of Alejandro Mayorkas =

2024 charging of US government official

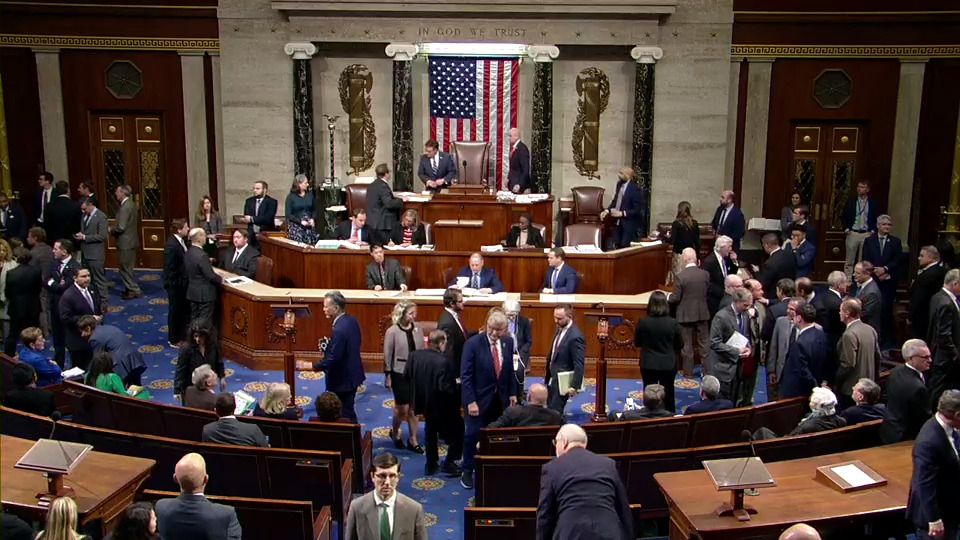
- The House of Representatives votes to impeach Alejandro Mayorkas.
- Accused: Alejandro Mayorkas (Secretary of Homeland Security)
- Proponents: Mike Johnson (Speaker of the House of Representatives)
- Date: February 13, 2024 – April 17, 2024 (2 months and 4 days)
- Charges: Dereliction of duty, perjury, contempt of Congress
- Cause: Mexico–United States border crisis

Congressional votes

First vote in the U.S. House of Representatives
- Accusation: Failure to comply with Federal immigration laws and breaching the public trust
- Votes in favor: 214
- Votes against: 216
- Present: 0
- Not voting: 1
- Result: ✗ Failed

Second vote in the U.S. House of Representatives
- Accusation: Failure to comply with Federal immigration laws and breaching the public trust
- Votes in favor: 214
- Votes against: 213
- Present: 0
- Not voting: 4
- Result: ✓ Approved

Vote in the U.S. Senate to dismiss Article I
- Accusation: Point of order that Article I — Failure to comply with Federal immigration laws, is unconstitutional and therefore out of order
- Votes in favor: 51
- Votes against: 48
- Present: 1
- Not voting: 0
- Result: ✓ Approved; Article ruled unconstitutional and out of order

Vote in the U.S. Senate to dismiss Article II
- Accusation: Point of order that Article II — Breach of public trust, is unconstitutional and therefore out of order
- Votes in favor: 51
- Votes against: 49
- Present: 0
- Not voting: 0
- Result: ✓ Approved; Article ruled unconstitutional and out of order

On January 28, 2024, House Republicans indicated their intention to move forward with two articles of impeachment against Alejandro Mayorkas, the United States Secretary of Homeland Security, alleging "willful and systemic refusal to comply with the law" in regards to federal immigration laws and breach of the public trust. On January 31, Republicans on the House Homeland Security Committee approved the articles along party lines for referral to the full House. Mayorkas is the second Cabinet member in history, and first since Secretary of War William W. Belknap in 1876, to be impeached.

A full House vote on February 6 to impeach failed to pass in a 214–216 vote, with four House Republicans joining the minority Democratic Party in voting against the impeachment resolution. Mayorkas was impeached in a second vote on February 13, on a 214–213 vote, with three House Republicans joining Democrats in voting against the impeachment resolution.

On April 16, the articles of impeachment were delivered to the Senate. The next day, the Senate dismissed the accusations by agreeing to a point of order that the articles of impeachment did not comply with the United States Constitution because they did not "allege conduct that rises to the level of a high crime or misdemeanor".

== Background ==
On November 23, 2020, President-elect Joe Biden announced his plan to nominate Alejandro Mayorkas, who had previously served in the Obama Administration as Director of U.S. Citizenship and Immigration Services and later as Deputy Secretary of Homeland Security, to be Secretary of Homeland Security. Mayorkas was confirmed by the United States Senate in a 56–43 vote. This made Mayorkas's appointment one of the most contested of all Biden's cabinet nominees.

In August 2021, Congressman Andy Biggs introduced a resolution to impeach Mayorkas. It was referred to the House Committee on the Judiciary and saw no further action.

Ahead of the 2022 United States House elections, several Republican members of the U.S. House of Representatives expressed support for the idea of impeaching Mayorkas if their party won a House majority. After Republicans won narrow control of the House for the 118th United States Congress, several impeachment resolutions were introduced and referred to committees without further action, including ones introduced by Pat Fallon in January 2023, Andy Biggs in February 2023, Marjorie Taylor Greene in May 2023, and Clay Higgins in June 2023.

On November 9, 2023, Greene filed a motion to impeach Mayorkas, citing a dereliction of duty and saying he "failed to maintain operational control of the [Southern] border". The motion to impeach failed to pass on November 13, with the House voting 209–201 to refer the resolution to the House Homeland Security Committee. Eight Republicans joined all Democrats in blocking the measure from passing outright.

== Impeachment articles ==
The resolution presenting the articles of impeachment against Mayorkas was introduced in the House of Representatives by Congresswoman Marjorie Taylor Greene on November 13, 2023. An amended resolution was reported from the House Committee on Homeland Security on February 3, 2024.

=== Article 1 ===
Article 1 of the impeachment alleged that Mayorkas "willfully and systematically refused to comply with Federal immigration laws". The article focused on the Immigration and Nationality Act of 1952, which, according to the resolution, requires that migrants be detained while waiting for an asylum decision.

=== Article 2 ===
Article 2 of the impeachment alleged that Mayorkas "breached the public trust" by lying to Congress and hindering the House Republican-led investigation into the Department of Homeland Security.

== House votes ==
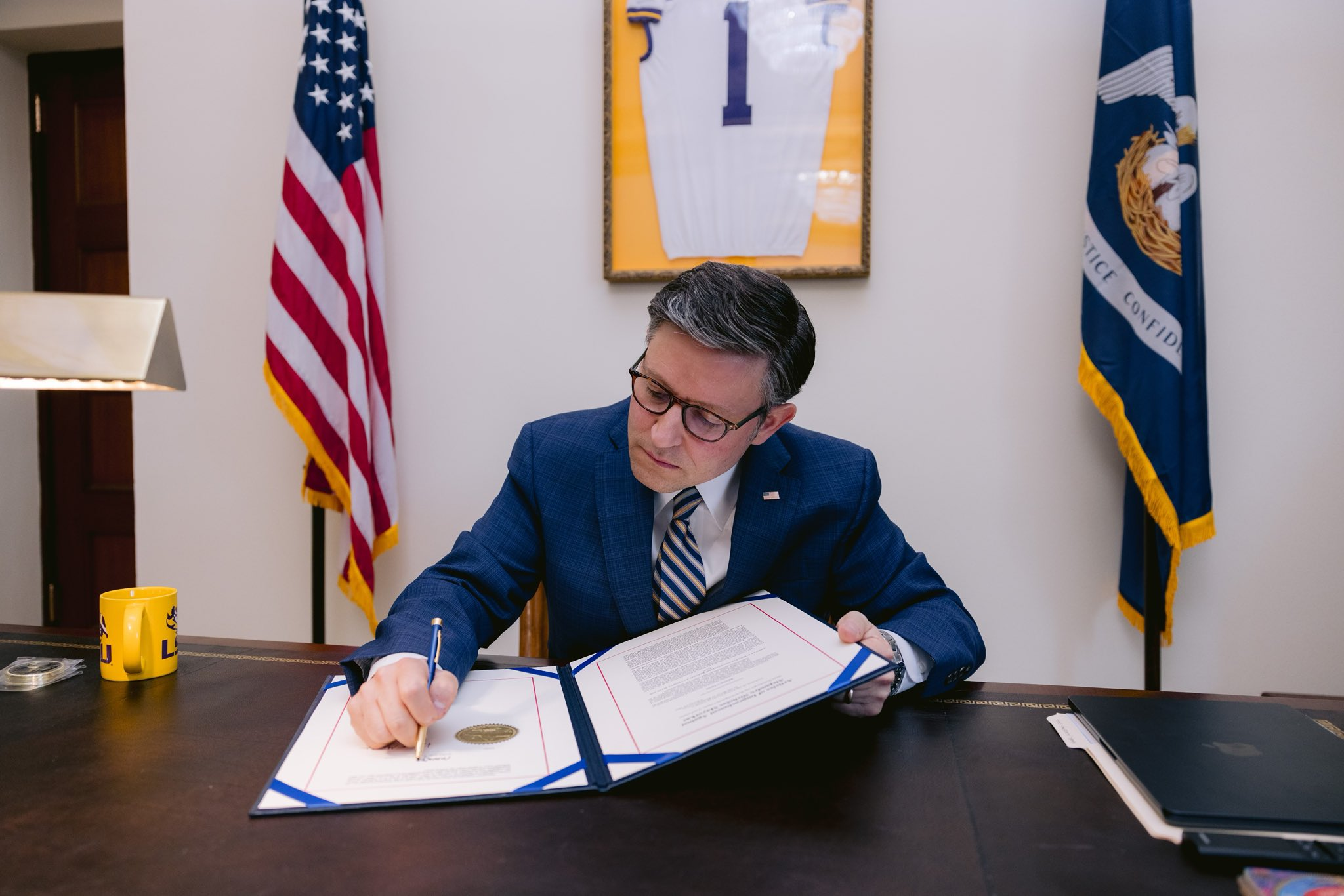
Speaker Mike Johnson signs the articles of impeachment after their adoption.

=== First vote ===
On February 6, 2024, the House of Representatives voted to not impeach Mayorkas with 216 voting against and 214 voting in favor. Four Republican members broke party ranks to vote against the impeachment: Ken Buck (CO-04), Mike Gallagher (WI-08), Tom McClintock (CA-05), and Blake Moore (UT-01). Steve Scalise (LA-01), the House majority leader, was absent for the vote due to being treated for blood cancer. Representative Al Green of Texas was the final member to arrive, casting his no vote to tie 215–215 from a wheelchair while wearing hospital scrubs after abdominal surgery. Moore changed his vote to no shortly before the Speaker called the vote, allowing Republicans to vote again on the impeachment in the future as part of a motion to reconsider.

Vote to impeach
| Party | Yes | No | Not voting |
|---|---|---|---|
| Republican | 214 | 4 | 1 |
| Democratic | —N/a | 212 | —N/a |
| Percentage | 49.8% | 50.2% | —N/a |
| Total votes | 214 | ✗ 216 | 1 |

=== Second vote ===
Following the first vote, Homeland Security Chair Mark Green (TN-07) said that Republicans intended to vote to impeach Mayorkas a second time when Scalise returned. On February 9, the House Republican Caucus said they would vote again to impeach Mayorkas on Tuesday, February 13. On February 13, 2024, the House voted 214–213 to impeach Mayorkas. Ken Buck, Mike Gallagher, and Tom McClintock again opposed the effort by their conference. Four representatives missed the vote. Democrat Judy Chu missed the vote due to contracting COVID-19, while the three others were Floridian Representatives who had flight delays: Republicans Brian Mast and María Salazar, along with Democrat Lois Frankel.

Vote to impeach
| Party | Yes | No | Not voting |
|---|---|---|---|
| Republican | 214 | 3 | 2 |
| Democratic | —N/a | 210 | 2 |
| Percentage | 50.1% | 49.9% | —N/a |
| Total votes | ✓ 214 | 213 | 4 |

== Senate trial ==
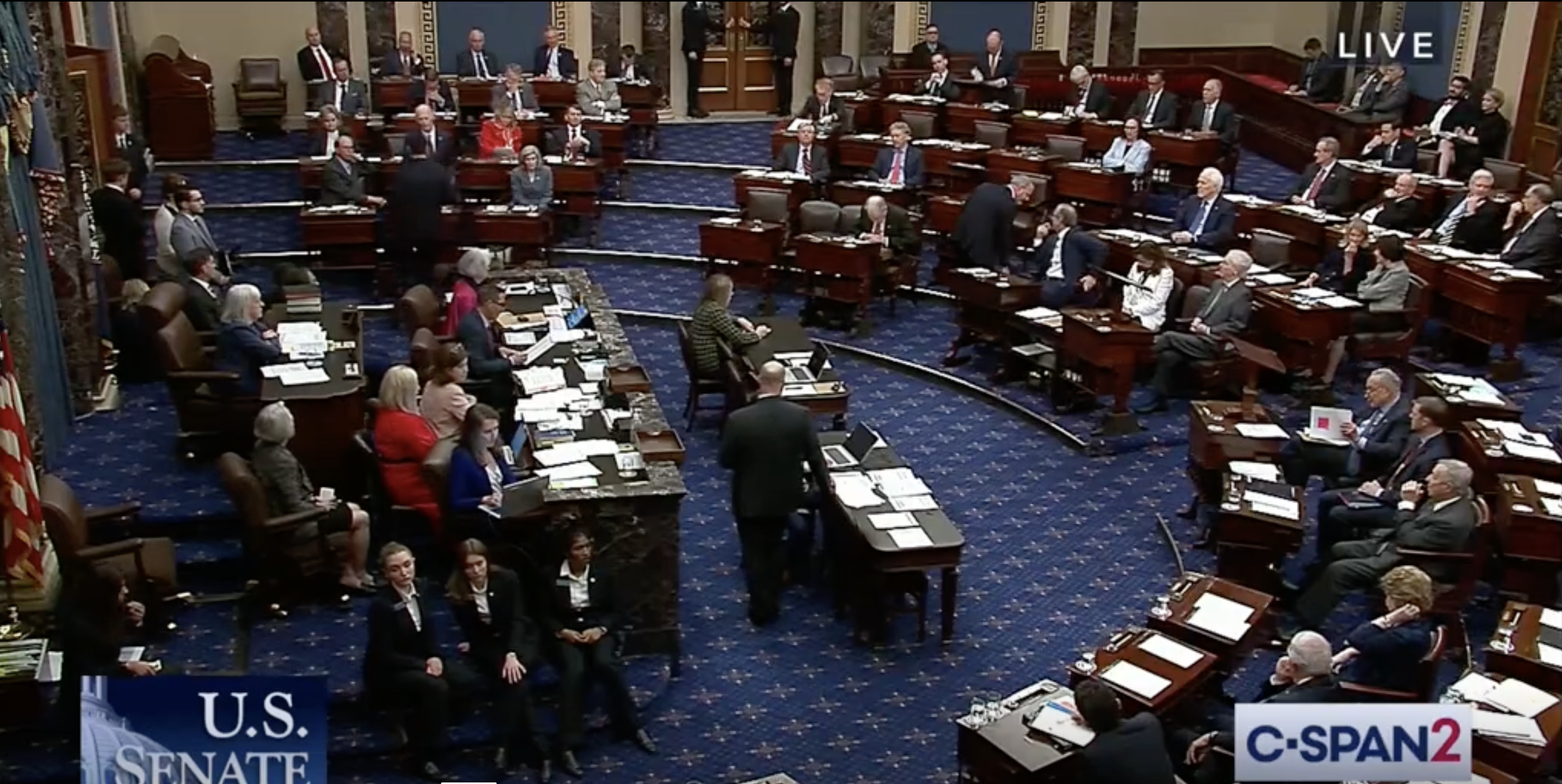
Senate chamber during the proceedings on April 17, 2024

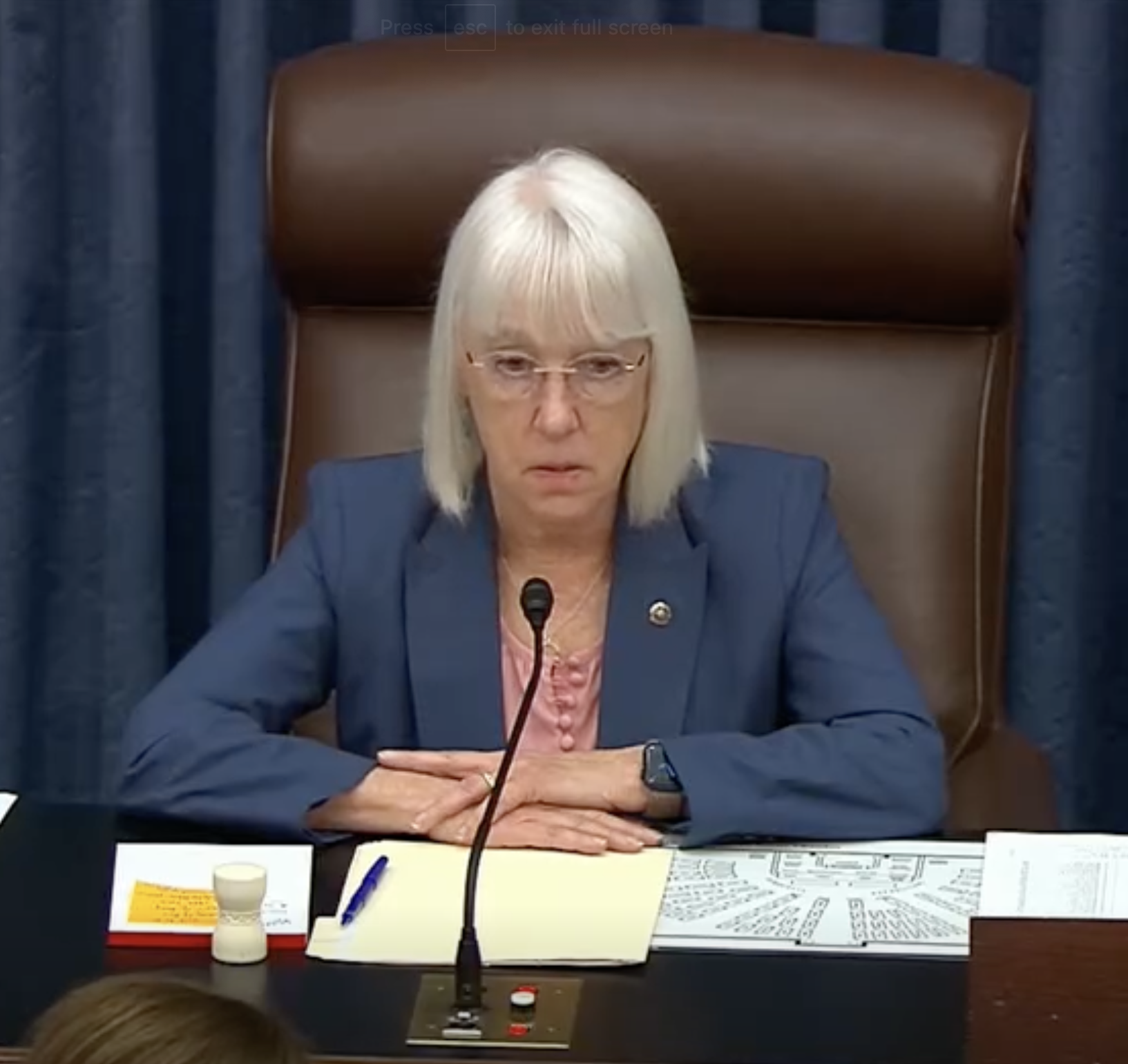
Senate President Pro Tempore Patty Murray presiding over the Senate proceedings

The Senate began its impeachment proceedings on April 16, 2024. The impeachment managers were Mark Green, Michael McCaul, Andy Biggs, Ben Cline, Andrew Garbarino, Michael Guest, Harriet Hageman, Clay Higgins, Laurel Lee, August Pfluger, and Marjorie Taylor Greene. Under Senate rules, the impeachment trial must begin within one legislative day.

The trial officially began on April 17. Patty Murray (the president pro tempore of the Senate) presided. After Senate Republicans rejected a time agreement proposed by Senate Majority Leader Chuck Schumer, which would have allowed for a limited amount of debate on the impeachment and set up a vote for a full trial, Schumer made a point of order that neither article of impeachment alleged "conduct that rises to the level of a high crime or misdemeanor" as required by the Constitution for an impeachment, and that they should have therefore been ruled out of order. In response, Republicans introduced motions to debate the impeachment articles in a closed session, adjourn the trial until April 30, and table Schumer's motion to table to the first article of impeachment. All three Republican motions failed in party-line votes, with all three Senate Independents voting with Democrats.

=== Votes on points of order ===
The Senate voted that the Schumer point of order against the first article of impeachment was well-taken, thereby dismissing the article, in a 51–48–1 vote. All Democrats and Independents voted for the point of order, while all but one Republican voted against it; Lisa Murkowski voted "present".

Vote on point of order alleging the first article of impeachment is unconstitutional
| Party | Yes | No | Present |
|---|---|---|---|
| Democratic | 48 | —N/a | —N/a |
| Republican | —N/a | 48 | 1 |
| Independent | 3 | —N/a | —N/a |
| Percentage | 51.5% | 48.5% | —N/a |
| Total votes | ✓ 51 | 48 | 1 |

The Senate voted that the Schumer point of order against the second article of impeachment was well-taken, thereby dismissing this article as well, in a 51–49 vote. All Democrats and Independents voted for the point of order and all Republicans voted against it.

Vote on point of order alleging the second article of impeachment is unconstitutional
| Party | Yes | No | Present |
|---|---|---|---|
| Democratic | 48 | —N/a | —N/a |
| Republican | —N/a | 49 | —N/a |
| Independent | 3 | —N/a | —N/a |
| Percentage | 51% | 49% | —N/a |
| Total votes | ✓ 51 | 49 | —N/a |

== Response ==
Constitutional legal scholars asserted Republicans were using impeachment to address immigration policy differences rather than for high crimes and misdemeanors, of which there was no evidence. Doris Meissner, who was the Commissioner of the Immigration and Naturalization Service during the Clinton Administration, the predecessor to the Department of Homeland Security, said: "These arguments that he’s violated the law and violated court orders are a smokescreen." Legal scholar and law professor Jonathan Turley commented that the impeachment lacked a "cognizable basis" and that the inquiry had failed to show "conduct by the secretary that could be viewed as criminal or impeachable". Frank Bowman of the University of Missouri School of Law, stated that using impeachment "to change policy" would "be contrary to America’s constitutional design". Former DHS secretary Michael Chertoff, a Republican, wrote an opinion piece in The Wall Street Journal that "Republicans in the House should drop this impeachment charade and work with Mr. Mayorkas to deliver for the American people."

The conservative Wall Street Journal editorial board wrote an editorial opposing the impeachment, arguing "impeaching Mr. Mayorkas won't change enforcement policy and is a bad precedent that will open the gates to more cabinet impeachments by both parties", adding "a policy dispute doesn't qualify as a high crime and misdemeanor". The New York Times, The Washington Post, and CNN variously characterized the first failed vote as a "stunning rebuke", a "calamitous miscalculation", and a "story of a House in utter disarray".

Amid the impeachment process, on February 7, 2024, Republican Senators voted to block a bipartisan negotiated border security bill. Trump openly stated that he did not want Biden to have a political win, while a Trump spokesperson told a Republican negotiator, "I do not want you to solve the border crisis during the presidential election."

== See also ==
- Efforts to impeach Joe Biden
- Federal impeachment in the United States
- Mexico–United States border crisis
