= Mahogany Hills =

Mountain range in Nevada, United States

- Location within Nevada

Highest point
- Elevation: 2,346 m (7,697 ft)

Geography
- Country: United States
- State: Nevada
- District: Eureka County
- Range coordinates: 39°26′14.743″N 116°9′18.226″W
- Topo map: USGS Combs Peak

The Mahogany Hills are a mountain range in Eureka County, Nevada.
