= Lone Mountain (Eureka County, Nevada) =

Mountain in Eureka County, Nevada, United States

Coordinates: 39°35′57″N 116°15′35″W

Lone Mountain is a summit in the U.S. state of Nevada. The elevation is 7,864 feet (2,397 m).

Lone Mountain was so named on account of its isolated location relative to other summits in the area.

The climate is hemiboreal. The average temperature is 10 °C. The warmest month is July, at 28 °C, and the coldest is January, at −9 °C. The average annual rainfall is 261 mm. The wettest month is December, at 37 mm of rain, and the driest is June, at 2 mm.
