= Efforts to impeach Bill Clinton =

During his presidency, Bill Clinton, the 42nd president of the United States, saw multiple efforts to impeach him.

An early effort in Congress saw Republican congressman Bob Barr write a resolution, co-signed by eighteen fellow House Republicans, which sought to launch an impeachment inquiry in 1997.

In October of 1998, in the aftermath of the Clinton–Lewinsky scandal and the release of the Starr Report, which largely focused on the scandal, an impeachment inquiry was launched, and in December Clinton was impeached on allegations of perjury and obstruction of justice. Clinton was acquitted in his subsequent impeachment trial.

== Early support and efforts ==
By October 1993, a petition was being nationally circulated to impeach Clinton for, among other offenses, allegedly abusing his office and causing "great prejudice to the cause of law and justice." The petition was organized by Carol and Michael Benn.

In 1994, anti-abortion activist Randall Terry toured the country on an "Impeach Clinton '94 Tour".

In the spring of 1997, Republican congressman Bob Barr wrote to the House Committee on the Judiciary chairman, Henry Hyde, encouraging him to open an impeachment inquiry. Hyde responded that such an action would be premature.

== 1997 impeachment resolution by Bob Barr ==
In November 1997, Bob Barr introduced a resolution to launch an impeachment inquiry. The resolution did not specify any charges or allegations. Barr argued that Clinton had been "systematically operating outside the bounds" of the law. He accused Clinton of "systematic abuse of office," alleging campaign finance law violations and obstruction of congressional investigations. Eighteen other Republican members of the House of Representatives initially joined Barr in signing on to the resolution as co-sponsors. These members were Roscoe Bartlett, Helen Chenoweth, Barbara Cubin, John Doolittle, Lindsey Graham, Duncan L. Hunter, Sam Johnson, Jack Kingston, Jack Metcalf, John Mica, Ron Paul, Dana Rohrabacher, Pete Sessions, Chris Smith, Mark Souder, Linda Smith, Bob Stump, and Todd Tiahrt. The resolution was referred to the House Committee on Rules.

By this time, anti-Clinton activists had collected 100,000 signatures supporting his impeachment, and had launched at least four different websites on the internet. Among the groups circulating petitions supporting an impeachment of Clinton was a group named the "National Impeach Clinton ACTION Committee," which was run by the far-right John Birch Society, who called for Clinton to be impeached for the 1996 United States campaign finance controversy.

In December 1997, conservative activist Phyllis Schlafly wrote an op-ed calling for Barr's calls for an impeachment to be heeded, arguing that an impeachment inquiry should be launched into allegations that Clinton and his vice president Al Gore had made campaign fundraising phone calls from their White House offices, as well as into the 1996 United States campaign finance controversy.

Directly after the Clinton–Lewinsky scandal came to light, Barr ramped up his efforts to push for Clinton's impeachment, appearing regularly on television, as well as even publishing a scholarly article in the Texas Law Review on the subject. Barr was the first lawmaker in either chamber of the United States Congress to call for Clinton's resignation over the scandal. In February 1998, Barr traveled to Los Angeles, at the John Birch Society's expense, to speak to them about his efforts to impeach Clinton. In 1998, after the scandal broke, an additional fourteen congressmen co-sponsored the resolution, three of them by early March 1998 and an additional nine in September 1998.

== Impeachment ==
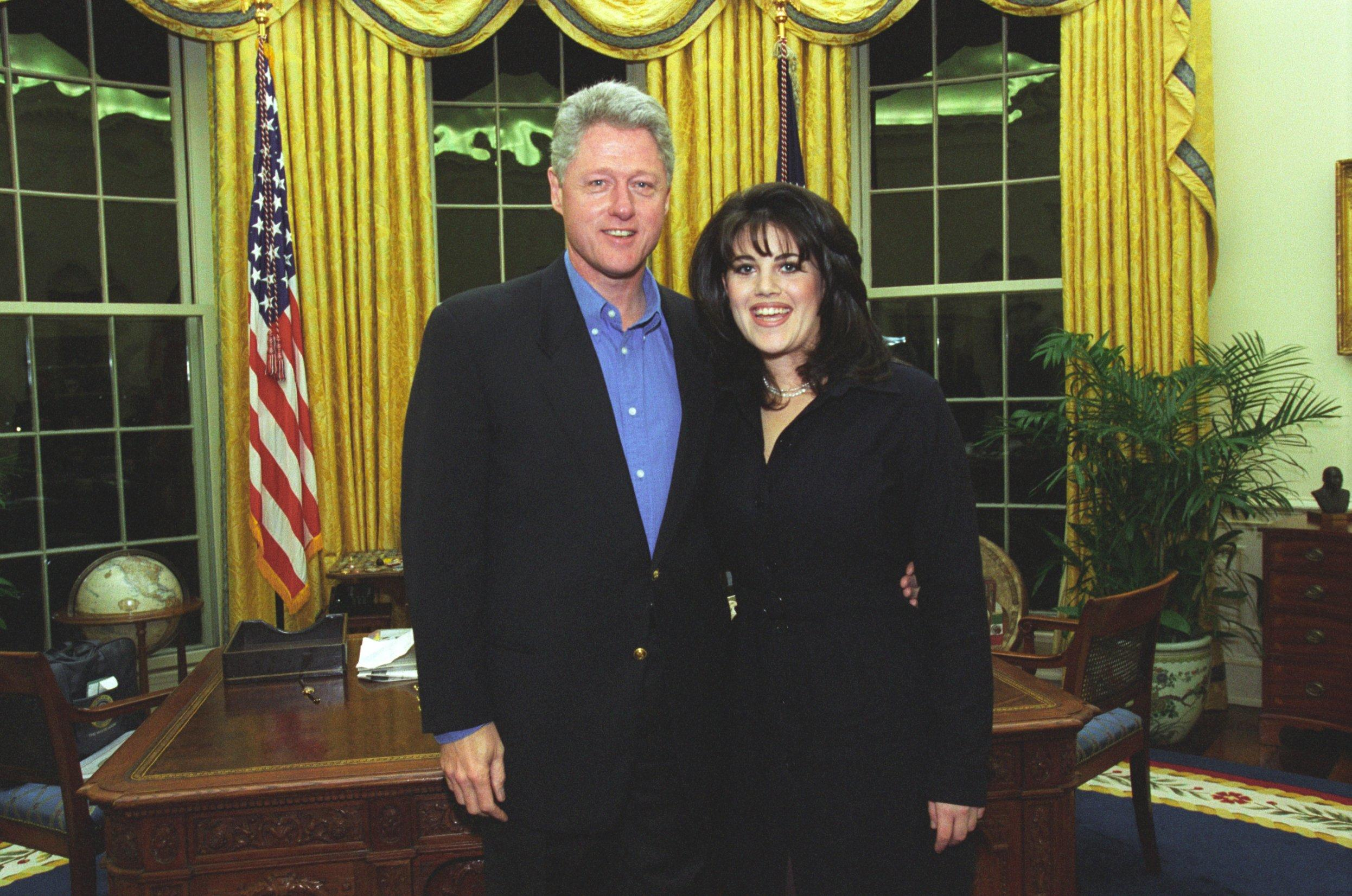
Bill Clinton and Monica Lewinsky

On October 8, 1998, in the aftermath of the Clinton–Lewinsky scandal and a month after the release of the Starr Report, which largely focused on the scandal, an impeachment inquiry was launched. On December 19, 1998, Clinton was impeached on allegations of perjury and obstruction of justice. Clinton was acquitted in his subsequent trial.
