= COVID-19 eviction moratoriums in the United States =

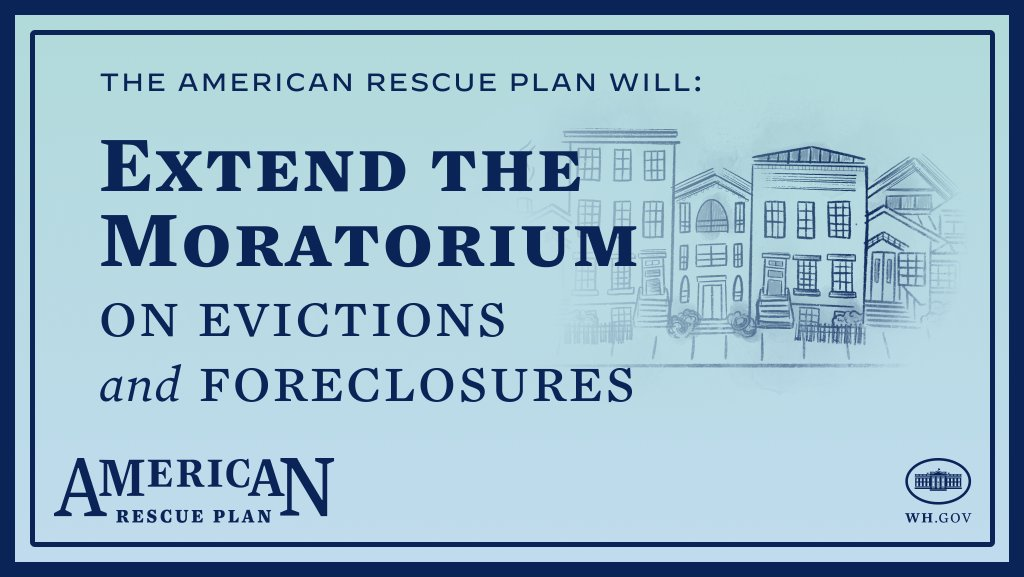
Graphic released by the White House on February 4, 2021, urging Congress to pass the American Rescue Plan Act.

In response to the COVID-19 pandemic, the United States federal government and several U.S. states implemented moratoriums on eviction.

== Federal ==
In March 2020, the United States Congress passed the CARES Act, which included a moratorium on the evictions of tenants in rental properties that receive federal funding or have federal government-backed mortgages until July 2020.

The Centers for Disease Control and Prevention (CDC) announced an additional eviction moratorium on September 1, 2020, expected to last until December 31 of that year. The order cited Section 361 of the Public Health Service Act, (Note: Temporary Halt in Residential Evictions To Prevent the Further Spread of COVID-19 (85 FR 55292)) which gives the agency authority to:

[...] provide for such inspection, fumigation, disinfection, sanitation, pest extermination, destruction of animals or articles found to be so infected or contaminated as to be sources of dangerous infection to human beings, and other measures, as in [the Surgeon General's] judgment may be necessary.

A challenge to the moratorium was filed in November by the Alabama Association of Realtors. In the District Court for D.C., Judge Dabney L. Friedrich ruled that the Public Health Service act did not give the CDC authority to enact moratoria on evictions. Friedrich cited the rule of eiusdem generis, writing that evictions were too dissimilar from the other items listed in Section 361 to be covered under the phrase "and other measures." On appeal, the Supreme Court voted 5–4, to maintain the moratorium.

The Biden administration issued a new eviction moratorium on August 3, 2021, intended to last until October 3. (Note: Temporary Halt in Residential Evictions in Communities With Substantial or High Transmission of COVID-19 To Prevent the Further Spread of COVID-19 (86 FR 43244)) It was applicable to counties with substantial or high transmission rates of COVID-19. On August 26, the Supreme Court struck down the moratorium. (Note: Alabama Association of Realtors v. Department of Health and Human Services, 594 U.S. ___ (2021))

== State ==
43 U.S. states have implemented some form of an eviction moratorium during the COVID-19 pandemic; 27 of these states lifted their eviction moratoriums between May and September 2020.

=== California ===
On June 28, 2021, Governor Newsom signed a bill passed by the California State Legislature extending eviction protections until September 30.

=== New York ===
In December 2020, the New York State Legislature passed a state moratorium on evictions. In May 2021, the legislature extended the moratorium until August 31.

The Supreme Court struck down a provision of the state moratorium that protected people who filed a form declaring economic hardship, rather than providing evidence in court.

== See also ==
- United States responses to the COVID-19 pandemic
- Economic impact of the COVID-19 pandemic in the United States
- Eviction in the United States
