= Helen Chenoweth-Hage =

American politician (1938–2006)

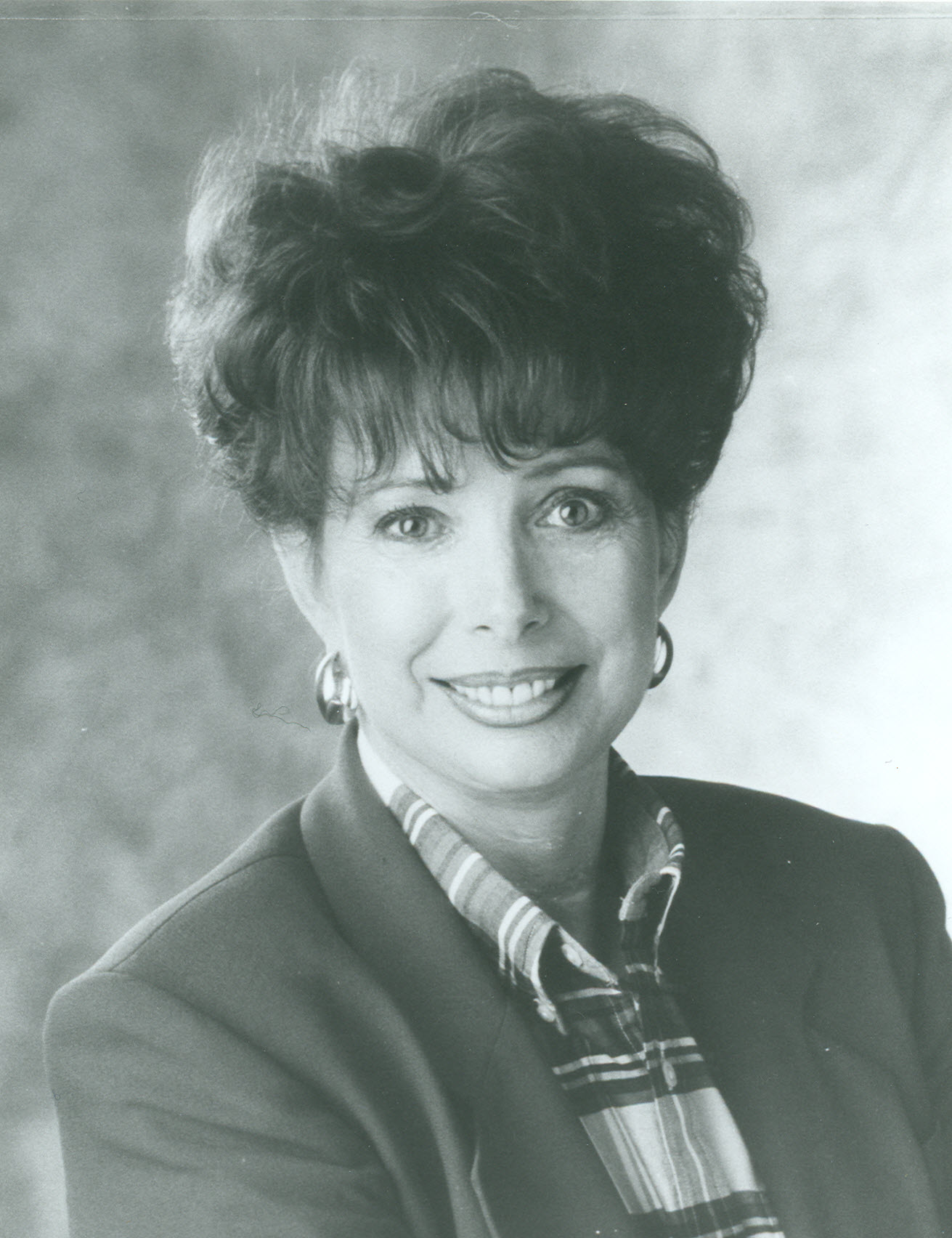

Member of the U.S. House of Representatives from Idaho's 1st district
- In office January 3, 1995 – January 3, 2001
- Preceded by: Larry LaRocco
- Succeeded by: Butch Otter

Personal details
- Born: Helen Margaret Palmer; January 27, 1938 Topeka, Kansas, U.S.
- Died: October 2, 2006 (aged 68) near Tonopah, Nevada, U.S.
- Resting place: Pine Creek Ranch Family Cemetery; Monitor Valley, Nevada, U.S.
- Party: Republican
- Spouses: Nicholas S. Chenoweth (m. 1958; div. 1975) E. Wayne Hage (m. 1999; died 2006)
- Children: 2
- Education: Whitworth College (attended)
- Profession: Consultant

Helen Margaret Chenoweth-Hage (née Palmer; born January 27, 1938 – October 2, 2006) was an American politician from the U.S. state of Idaho, serving three terms in the U.S. House of Representatives from 1995 to 2001. She remains one of two women to ever represent Idaho in the United States Congress and the only one from the Republican Party.

== Early life and career ==
She was born in Kansas. Her family moved west to Los Angeles when Helen was a year old, then north to southern Oregon when she was 12, to run a dairy farm near Grants Pass. A musician, horse enthusiast, and athlete, she attended Whitworth College in Spokane, Washington on music scholarship (double bass), where she met Nick Chenoweth while working in a cafeteria; she was a waitress and he was a cook. The two were married in 1958.

They had two children, Michael and Margaret (Meg), both born in Nick's hometown of Orofino, Idaho. The Chenoweths ran a ski shop near the modest Bald Mountain ski area. Later, Helen developed and managed the Northside Medical Clinic, where she initiated a physician recruitment practice for under-served rural communities, while Nick attended the UI law school in Moscow.

The Chenoweths divorced in 1975 and Helen moved to Boise to become executive director of the Idaho Republican Party. Later she went on to serve as then-Congressman Steve Symms' District Director in 1977 through his re-election in 1978, then started her own business, Consulting Associates, and became a noteworthy lobbyist in Idaho's capital city.

== Election and Congressional career ==
In 1994, Chenoweth won the Republican nomination for Idaho's 1st Congressional District over former Lieutenant Governor David H. Leroy and two other challengers. She pledged to serve no more than three terms in the U.S. House if elected. She defeated two-term Democratic incumbent Larry LaRocco by almost 11 points in the Republican wave that saw that party take control of the House for the first time in 40 years. During the campaign, Chenoweth attacked LaRocco for supporting the Omnibus Budget Reconciliation Act of 1993; he was the only Idahoan in either chamber to back the bill. While Chenoweth's victory was one of many instances of historically Republican districts reverting to form after electing Democrats, it was still surprising considering LaRocco's 20-point victory margin in 1992.

With her victory in 1994, Chenoweth became the second woman (after Gracie Pfost) to represent Idaho in Congress and one of few members to be elected by her peers to chair a subcommittee (House Subcommittee on Forest and Forest Health) after only one term.

As one of the "true believers" in the Republican freshman class of 1995, Chenoweth was considered one of the most conservative members of the House. She staunchly opposed government regulation, and was a strong supporter of school prayer. One measure placed her as the most conservative woman to serve in Congress between 1937 and 2004. Much was made of her "insistence" on the title "Congressman Chenoweth" (as opposed to the more common "Congresswoman").

During her tenure, she was referred to by her most outspoken critics as a "poster-child for the militias," and in February 1995 she voiced the suspicion that armed federal agents were landing black helicopters on Idaho ranchers' property to enforce the Endangered Species Act, in line with a longstanding conspiracy theory. "I have never seen them," Chenoweth said in an interview in The New York Times. "But enough people in my district have become concerned that I can't just ignore it. We do have some proof." The Los Angeles Times editorialized that during the campaign she gained national attention by "holding 'endangered salmon bakes' during fundraisers, serving canned salmon to ridicule the listing of Idaho salmon as an endangered species." She was quoted as saying in response, "It's the white, Anglo-Saxon male that's endangered today."

Chenoweth faced a strong challenge in 1996 from Democratic activist Dan Williams, but was reelected in a close contest—most likely helped by Bob Dole easily carrying the district in the presidential election. Chenoweth defeated Williams again in 1998 by a wider margin. She later said that she regretted limiting herself to three terms and called the whole concept of term limits bad policy. She nonetheless honored her pledge and did not run for reelection to a fourth term in 2000. She was succeeded by Lieutenant Governor Butch Otter, a fellow Republican. Since her retirement, no women have represented Idaho in either house of Congress.

Chenoweth remained a controversial and polarizing figure in Idaho politics throughout her career. While in Congress she articulated and defended a "freedom" philosophy that was simultaneously cherished by her supporters and derided by her opponents.

=== Criticism of President Clinton ===
In November 1997, Chenoweth was one of eighteen Republicans in the House to co-sponsor a resolution by Bob Barr that sought to launch an impeachment inquiry into President Bill Clinton. The resolution did not specify any charges or allegations. This was an early effort to impeach Clinton, predating the eruption of the Clinton–Lewinsky scandal. The eruption of that scandal would ultimately lead to a more serious effort to impeach Clinton in 1998.

She was a critic of President Clinton during the Clinton–Lewinsky scandal and was one of the first to call for his resignation over the affair, although she admitted that she had carried on a six-year illicit romance with married rancher Vernon Ravenscroft when she worked for his natural-resources consulting firm during the 1980s. Chenoweth claimed that her case was different from the Clinton/Lewinsky case since she was a private citizen at the time, and because "I've asked for God's forgiveness, and I've received it."

On October 8, 1998, Chenoweth voted in favor of legislation that was passed to open an impeachment inquiry against Bill Clinton. On December 19, 1998, Chenoweth voted in favor of all four proposed articles of impeachment against Clinton (only two of which received the majority of votes needed to be adopted).

== Later life ==
During her final term, Chenoweth married rancher and author Wayne Hage in Boise in 1999 and changed her name to Helen Chenoweth-Hage. After leaving Congress, she moved to Hage's Nevada ranch, where the two continued to write and speak on private property rights issues. Wayne Hage died after being treated for cancer at age 68 on June 5, 2006.

After leaving Congress, Chenoweth-Hage continued to make headlines. In 2003 at the Boise Airport she was selected by the Transportation Security Administration for a hand search before they would permit her to board a plane for her Nevada home. Chenoweth-Hage requested to see a copy of the regulation granting United States Department of Homeland Security the authority to search her without cause. When the request was denied, she refused to submit to the search and elected to make the 300-mile (480 km) trip by rental car. "Our borders are wide open and yet they're shaking down a 66-year-old white grandmother they greeted by name," she said of the incident. "It's time the American people say no to this kind of invasion. It's a question of personal privacy. There shouldn't be that kind of search without reasonable cause."

=== Death ===
On October 2, 2006, Chenoweth-Hage was killed after being thrown from the passenger seat of a sport utility vehicle that overturned on an isolated highway in central Nevada, near Tonopah. She was not wearing a seatbelt at the time of the accident. Her (step) daughter-in-law and grandson, who were also in the vehicle, suffered only minor injuries.

Chenoweth-Hage was memorialized at a service held in Meridian, Idaho, on October 9, 2006. She is buried alongside husband Wayne Hage at the Pine Creek Ranch Family Cemetery in Monitor Valley, Nevada. Her first husband, Nick Chenoweth, died in 2002 at age 66.

== Electoral history ==
- 1998 Race for U.S. House of Representatives – 1st District
  - Helen Chenoweth (R) (inc.), 55%
  - Dan Williams (D), 45%
- 1996 Race for U.S. House of Representatives – 1st District
  - Helen Chenoweth (R) (inc.), 49%
  - Dan Williams (D), 48%
- 1994 Race for U.S. House of Representatives – 1st District
  - Helen Chenoweth (R), 55%
  - Larry LaRocco (D) (inc.), 45%

== See also ==
- List of federal political sex scandals in the United States
- Women in the United States House of Representatives

== Notes ==
U.S. House of Representatives
Preceded by Larry LaRocco (D)	United States House of Representatives, Idaho First Congressional District; January 4, 1995–January 3, 2001	Succeeded by C. L. "Butch" Otter (R)
