= Monitor Valley =

Valley in Nevada, United States

Coordinates: 41°48′26″N 114°39′06″W

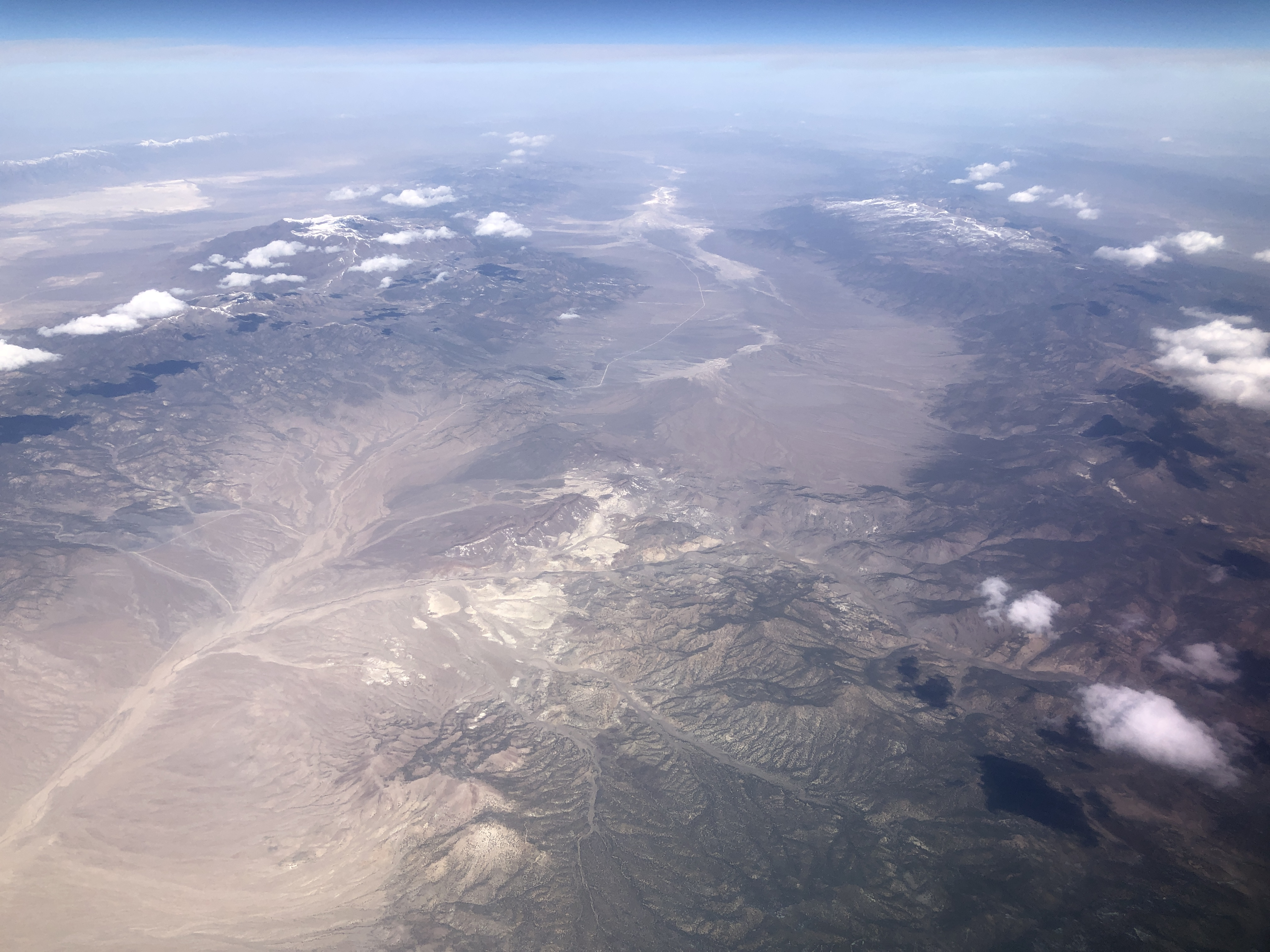
Monitor Valley (upper center) viewed from above and to the south

Monitor Valley is a valley in the U.S. state of Nevada.

== History ==
Monitor Valley took its name from a hill along its course which was subjectively likened to USS Monitor.
