= Pyramid Rock (New Mexico) =

Pillar in McKinley County, New Mexico, U.S.

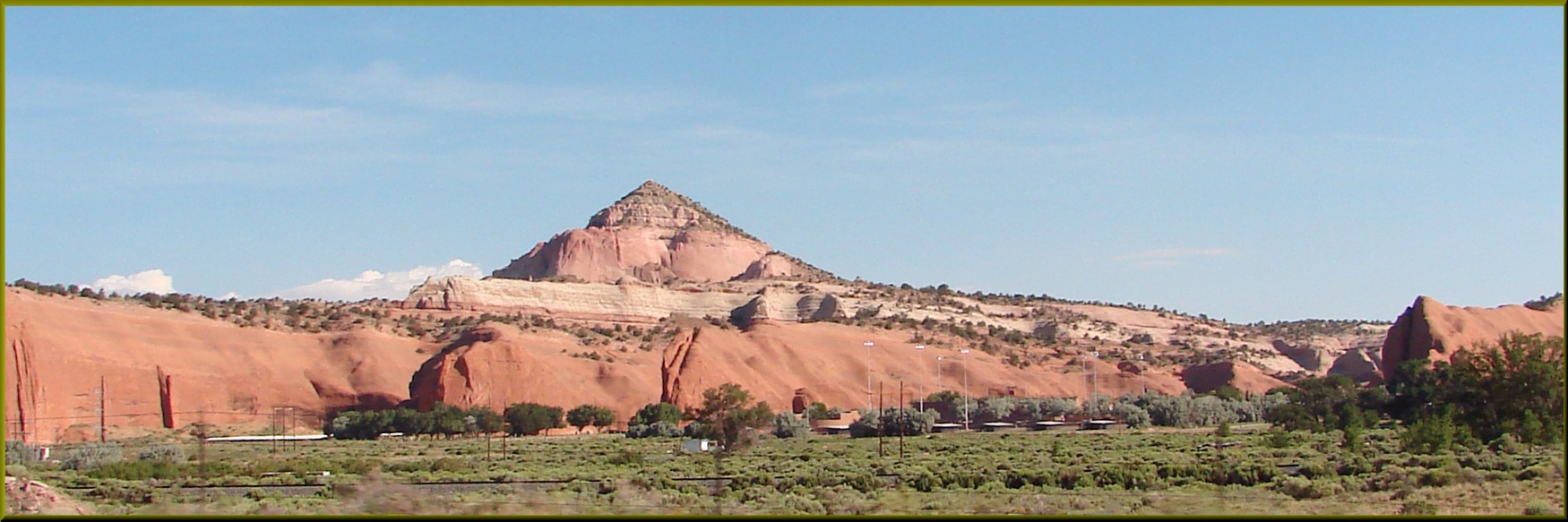
- South aspect

Highest point
- Elevation: 7,487 ft (2,282 m)
- Prominence: 497 ft (151 m)
- Isolation: 2.68 mi (4.31 km)
- Coordinates: 35°33′18″N 108°37′02″W

Geography
- Location within New Mexico Location within the United States
- Country: United States
- State: New Mexico
- County: McKinley
- Parent range: Zuñi Mountains; Colorado Plateau
- Topo map: USGS Church Rock

Geology
- Rock age: Late Jurassic
- Rock type: Morrison Formation

Climbing
- Easiest route: class 1 hiking

Pyramid Rock is a 7,487-foot-elevation (2,282-meter) pillar in McKinley County, New Mexico, United States.

== Description ==
Pyramid Rock is part of the Zuñi Mountains. The prominent landmark is located six miles (9.7 km) east-northeast of Gallup, 1.5 miles (2.4 km) northwest of the town of Church Rock, and can be seen from Interstate 40. Topographic relief is significant as the summit rises 700 feet (213 meters) in one-quarter mile (0.4 km). A 3.4 mile (round-trip) hiking trail provides access to the summit. Precipitation runoff from the mountain drains to the Puerco River. This landform's descriptive toponym has been officially adopted by the United States Board on Geographic Names.

== Geology ==
Pyramid Rock is composed of the Morrison Formation which dates to the Late Jurassic. This stratum overlays Zuni Sandstone, Bluff Sandstone, Summerville Formation, and Entrada Sandstone in descending order.

== Climate ==
According to the Köppen climate classification system, Pyramid Rock is located in a cool semiarid climate zone (Köppen BSk). The summers are hot during the day, but the high altitude and low humidity mean that nights remain distinctly cool. Most rain falls in the summer from afternoon thunderstorms, and winter snow is common and sometimes heavy.
