= Zuni Sandstone =

Geologic formation in New Mexico, US

- Stratigraphic range: middle Jurassic
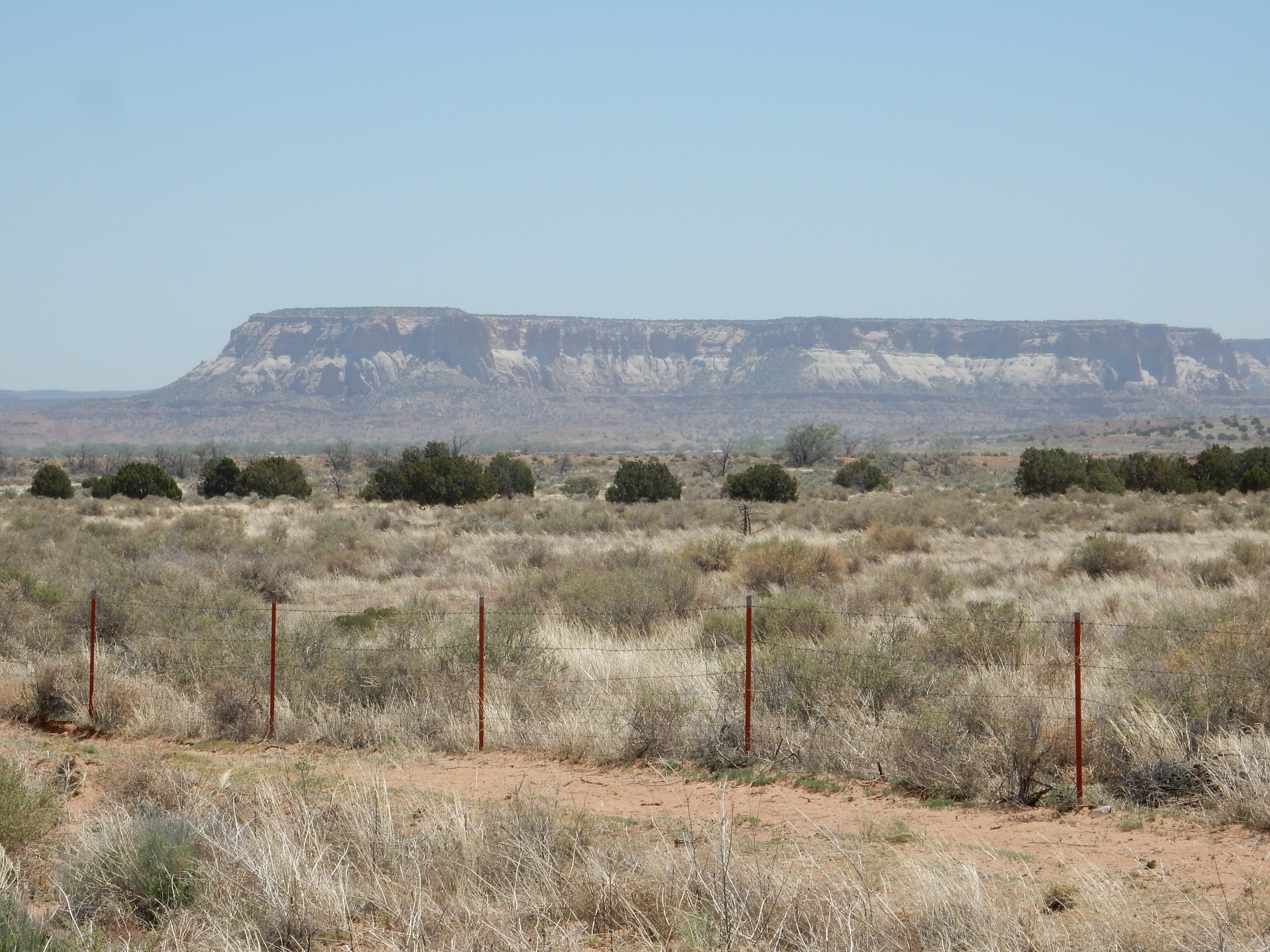
- Type locality of Zuni Sandstone at Dowa Yalanne
- Type: Formation
- Sub-units: San Rafael Group
- Underlies: Dakota Formation
- Overlies: Chinle Group. Wingate Sandstone
- Thickness: 150 m (490 ft)

Lithology
- Primary: Sandstone

Location
- Coordinates: 35.0525°N 108.7957°W
- Region: New Mexico
- Country: United States

Type section
- Named for: Zuni Plateau
- Named by: Clarence Dutton
- Year defined: 1885
- Zuni Sandstone (the United States) Zuni Sandstone (New Mexico)

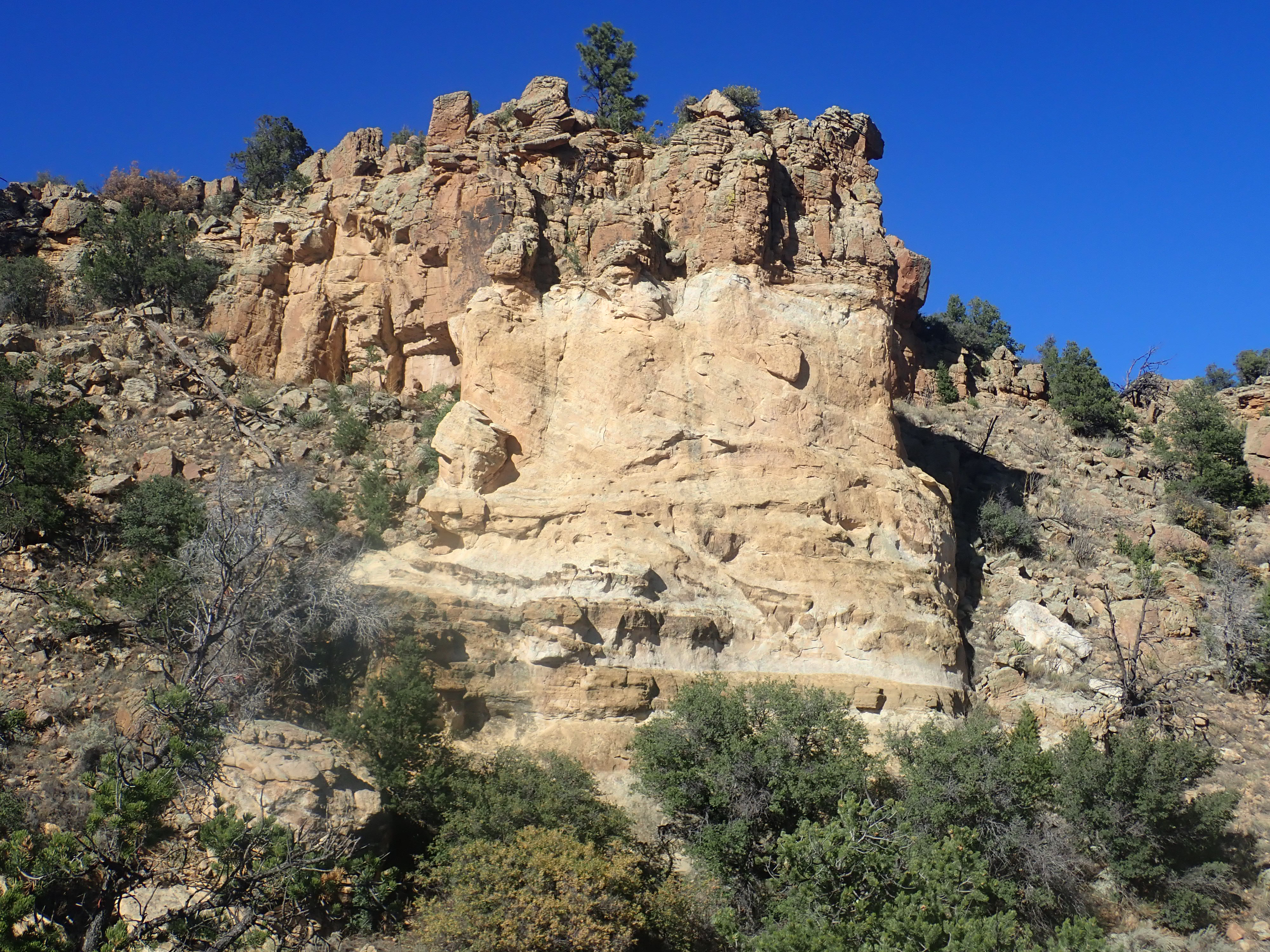
Outcrop of Zuni Sandstone at El Malpais National Monument, New Mexico

The Zuni Sandstone is a geologic formation in west-central New Mexico. It marks the southernmost limit of Jurassic fluvial and lacustrine sedimentary formations, which pinch out to leave a single sandstone body.

== Description ==
The Zuni Sandstone is found south of the I-40 corridor in west-central New Mexico. At about this latitude, the Todilto, Morrison, and Summerville Formations pinch out to leave a Jurassic section that is almost entirely composed of eolian sandstone. This is designated as the Zuni Sandstone, which is thus the lateral equivalent of the combined Entrada and Bluff Formations.

At the type section at Dowa Yalaane (Taaiyalone Mesa), the formation consists of about 80 meters (260 ft) of eolian sandstone corresponding to the Entrada Formation. A break corresponds to the pinched-out Todilto and Summerville Formations. Above this is about 60 meters (200 ft) of sandstone corresponding to the Bluff Formation. Then comes a break corresponding to the pinch-out of the Recapture Member of the Morrison Formation, another sandstone interval corresponding to the Acoma Tongue of the Zuni Sandstone, and a final break corresponding to the pinchout of the remaining Morrison Formation. The Zuni Formation unconformably rests on the Wingate Sandstone or Chinle Group and is unconformably overlain by the Dakota Formation.

== History of investigation ==
The unit was first described by Clarence Dutton in 1885. However, A.A. Baker, C.H. Dane, and J.B. Reeside regarded it as identical to the Morrison Formation. R.J. Hackman and A.B. Olson renamed the beds as the Cow Springs Sandstone in 1977 O.J. Anderson proposed the modern definition of the formation in 1983.
