= Beclabito Formation =

Geologic formation in New Mexico

- Stratigraphic range: Oxfordian
- Type: Formation
- Unit of: San Rafael Group
- Underlies: Bluff Formation
- Overlies: Todilto Formation
- Thickness: 108 ft (33 m)

Lithology
- Primary: Mudstone, sandstone

Location
- Coordinates: 36.6971°N 109.0366°W
- Region: New Mexico, Arizona
- Country: United States

Type section
- Named for: Beclabito Dome
- Named by: S.M. Condon and A.C. Huffman, Jr.
- Year defined: 1988
- Beclabito Formation (the United States) Beclabito Formation (New Mexico)

The Beclabito Formation is a late Jurassic sedimentary geologic formation, found in northwestern New Mexico and northeastern Arizona.

== Description ==
The formation is composed mostly of thinly bedded sandstone, siltstone, and mudstone which is reddish-orange to reddish-brown in color. The sandstone is very fine to medium grained and displays ripple crossbedding, trough crossbedding, and horizontal laminations. The siltstones are reddish-brown and show wavy laminations. The formation is 108 feet (33 m) thick. The formation conformably overlies the Todilto Formation and conformably underlies the Bluff Formation.

The formation is interpreted as having been deposited in a marginal marine or coastal sabkha environment.

== Investigative history ==
The formation was first named by S.M. Condon and H.C. Huffman, Jr., as the Beclabito Member of the Wanakah Formation. The beds making up the formation were previously assigned to the Summerville Formation on the basis of similar lithology and stratigraphic position, and on the similarity of the Curtis Formation that underlies the Summerville Formation to the Todilto Formation that underlies the Beclabito beds, but the correlation is questionable. Steven M. Cather concurred with reassigning the beds from the Summerville to the Beclabito, which he also proposed raising to formation rank. Cather pointed out that the Curtis appears to be younger than the Todilto, calling into question the correlation between the overlying Summerville and Beclabito beds, and that there are significant lithological differences between the Summerville and the Beclabito.
