= Morrison Formation =

Rock formation in the western United States

- Stratigraphic range: Upper Jurassic (latest Oxfordian to earliest Tithonian), 156.3–148.1 Ma
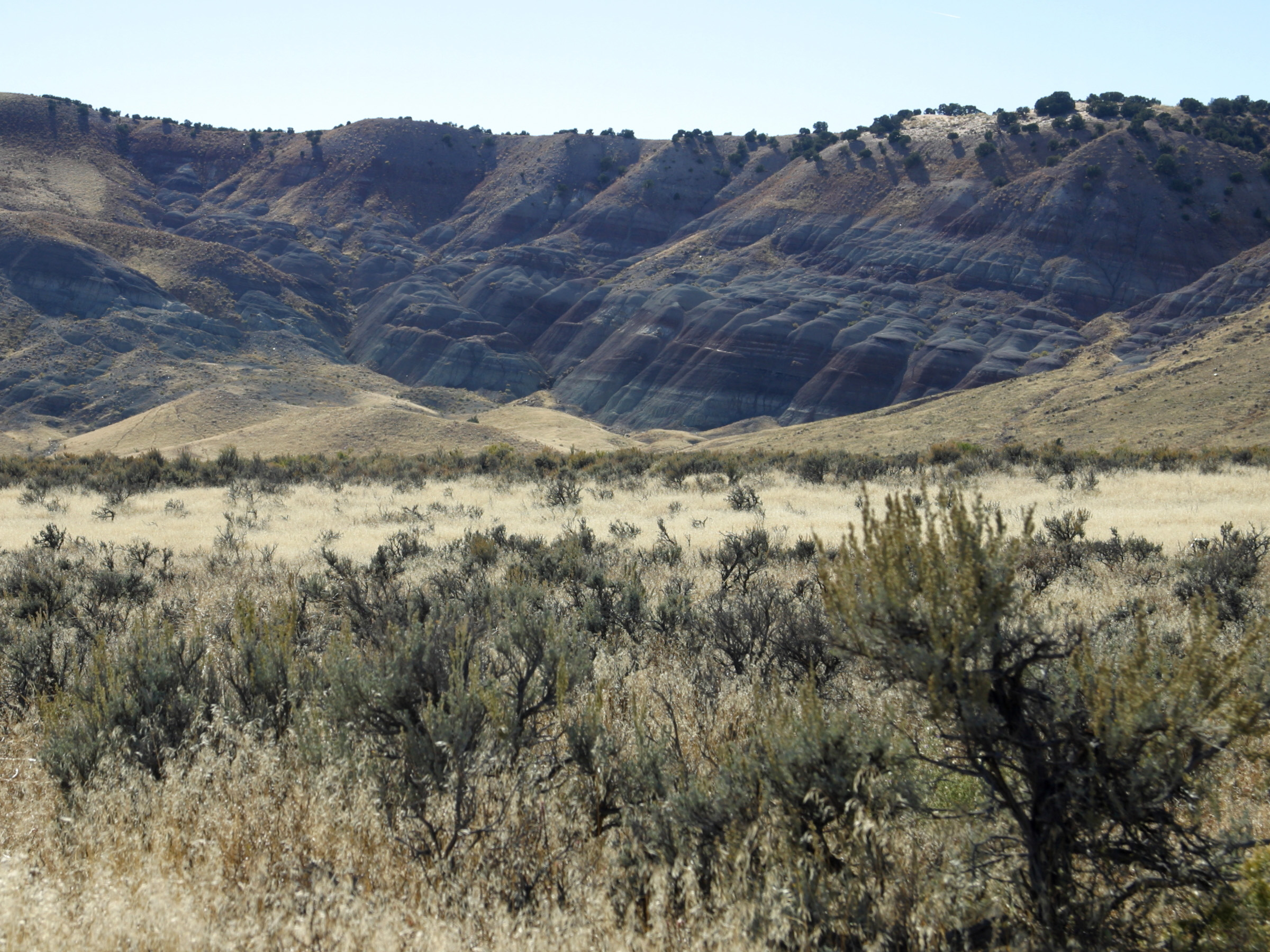
- The distinctive banding of the Morrison Formation, a group of rock layers that occur throughout Dinosaur National Monument and the source of fossils like those found at the Dinosaur Quarry
- Type: Geologic formation
- Underlies: Cedar Mountain Formation, Cloverly Formation, Lakota Formation, Burro Canyon Formation
- Overlies: Summerville Formation, Beclabito Formation, Curtis Formation, Bell Ranch Formation, Sundance Formation
- Thickness: Up to 200 m

Lithology
- Primary: Mudstone
- Other: Sandstone, siltstone, limestone

Location
- Coordinates: 39.651°N 105.188°W
- Approximate paleocoordinates: 40.4°N 53.2°W
- Region: Arizona, Colorado, Idaho, Kansas, Montana, Nebraska, New Mexico, North Dakota, Oklahoma, South Dakota, Texas, Utah, Wyoming
- Country: United States
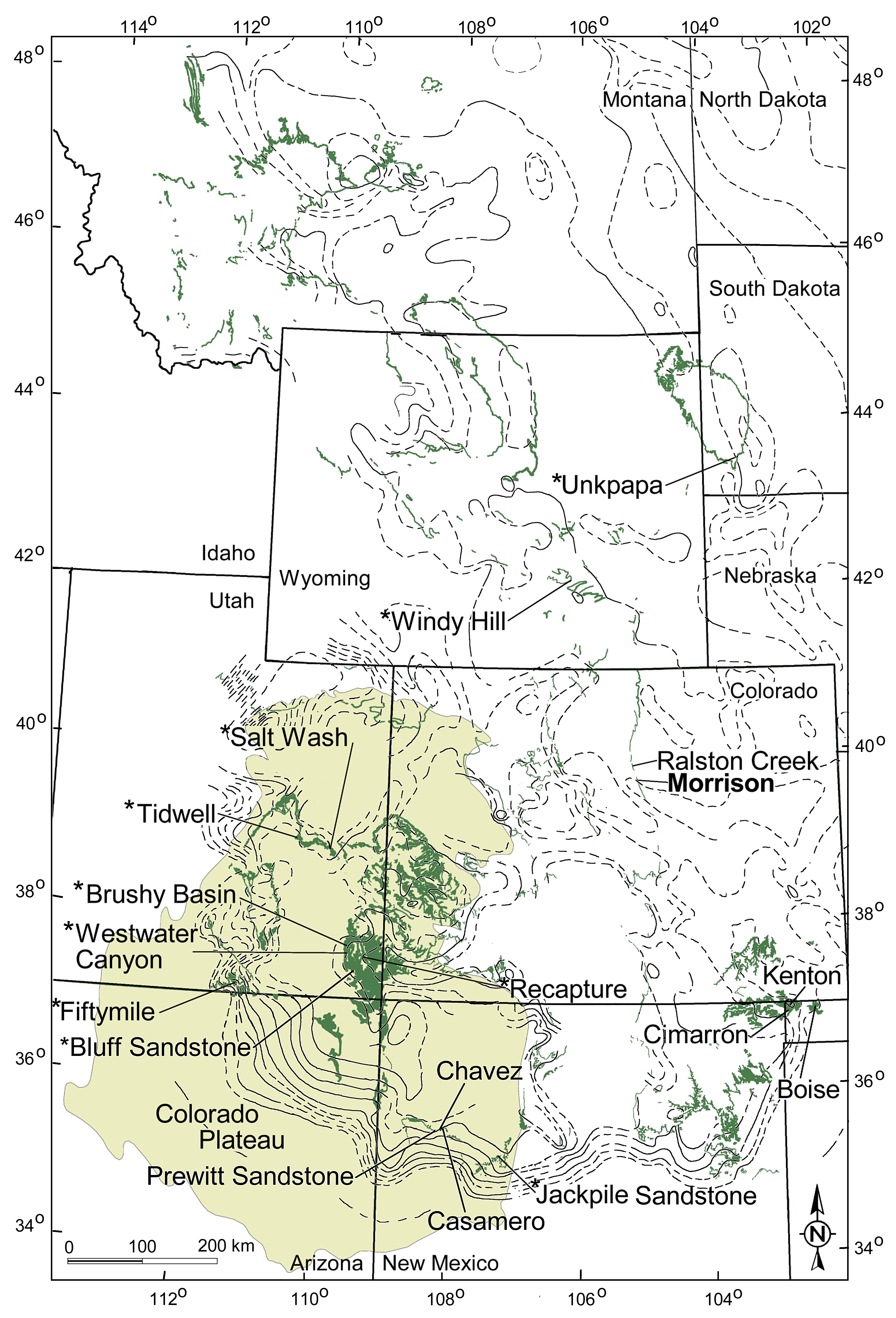
- Extent: Stratotypes for members of the Morrison Formation

Type section
- Named for: Morrison, Colorado
- Morrison Formation (the United States) Morrison Formation (Colorado)

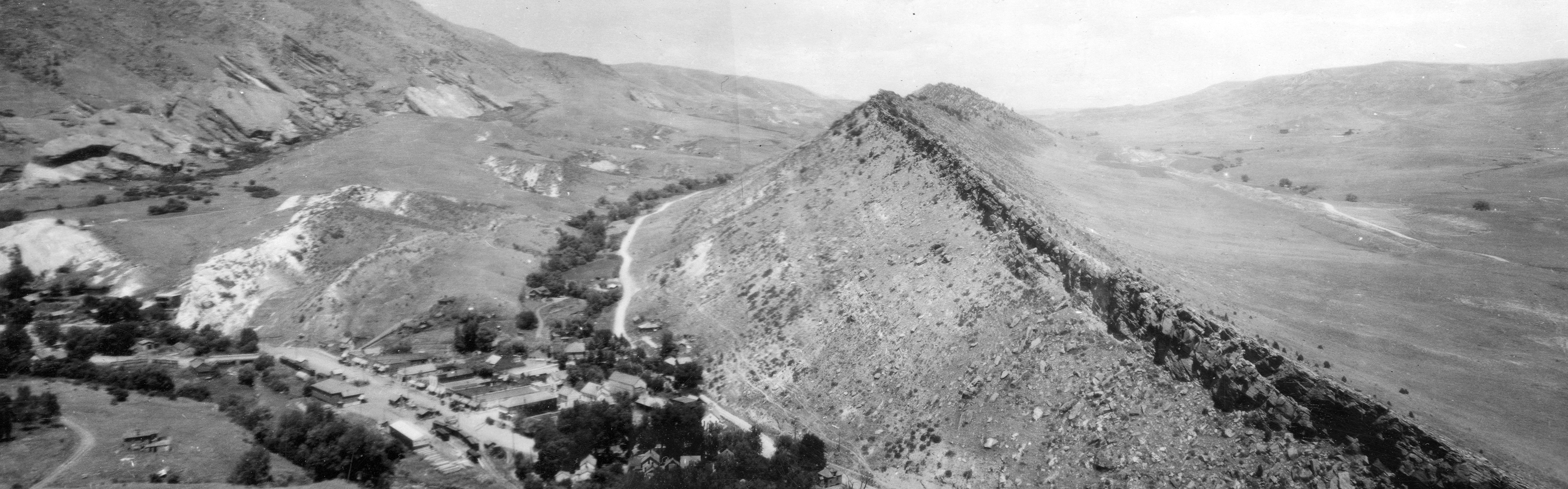
Type locality for the Morrison Formation above the town of Morrison, Colorado.

The Morrison Formation is a distinctive sequence of Upper Jurassic sedimentary rock found in the western United States which has been the most fertile source of dinosaur fossils in North America. It is composed of mudstone, sandstone, siltstone, and limestone and is light gray, greenish gray, or red. Most of the fossils occur in the green siltstone beds and lower sandstones, relics of the rivers and floodplains of the Jurassic period.

It is centered in Wyoming and Colorado, with outcrops in Montana, North Dakota, South Dakota, Nebraska, Kansas, the panhandles of Oklahoma and Texas, New Mexico, Arizona, Utah, and Idaho. Equivalent rocks under different names are found in Canada. It covers an area of 1.5 million square kilometers (600,000 square miles), although only a tiny fraction is exposed and accessible to geologists and paleontologists. Over 75% is still buried under the prairie to the east, and much of its western paleogeographic extent was eroded during exhumation of the Rocky Mountains.

It was named after Morrison, Colorado, where some of the first fossils in the formation were discovered by Arthur Lakes in 1877. That same year, it became the center of the Bone Wars, a fossil-collecting rivalry between early paleontologists Othniel Charles Marsh and Edward Drinker Cope. In Colorado, New Mexico, and Utah, the Morrison Formation was a major source of uranium ore.

== Geologic history ==
According to radiometric dating, the Morrison Formation dates from 156.3 ± 2 million years old (Ma) at its base, to 146.8 ± 1 million years old at the top, which places it in the earliest Kimmeridgian, and early Tithonian stages of the late Jurassic. This is similar in age to the Solnhofen Limestone Formation in Germany and the Tendaguru Formation in Tanzania. The age and much of the fauna is similar to the Lourinhã Formation in Portugal. Throughout the western United States, it variously overlies the Middle Jurassic Summerville, Sundance, Bell Ranch, Wanakah, and Stump Formations.

At the time, the supercontinent of Laurasia had recently split into the continents of North America and Eurasia, although they were still connected by land bridges. North America moved north and was passing through the subtropical regions.

The Morrison Basin, which stretched from New Mexico in the south to Alberta and Saskatchewan in the north, was formed during the Nevadan orogeny, a precursor event to later orogenic episodes that created the Rocky Mountains, as they started pushing up to the west. The deposits from their east-facing drainage basins, carried by streams and rivers from the Elko Highlands (along the borders of present-day Nevada and Utah) and deposited in swampy lowlands, lakes, river channels and floodplains, became the Morrison Formation.

In the north, the Sundance Sea, an extension of the Arctic Ocean, stretched through Canada down to the United States. Coal is found in the Morrison Formation of Montana, which means that the northern part of the formation, along the shores of the sea, was wet and swampy, with more vegetation. Aeolian, or wind-deposited sandstones, are found in the southwestern part, which indicates it was much more arid—a desert, with sand dunes.

== Stratigraphy ==
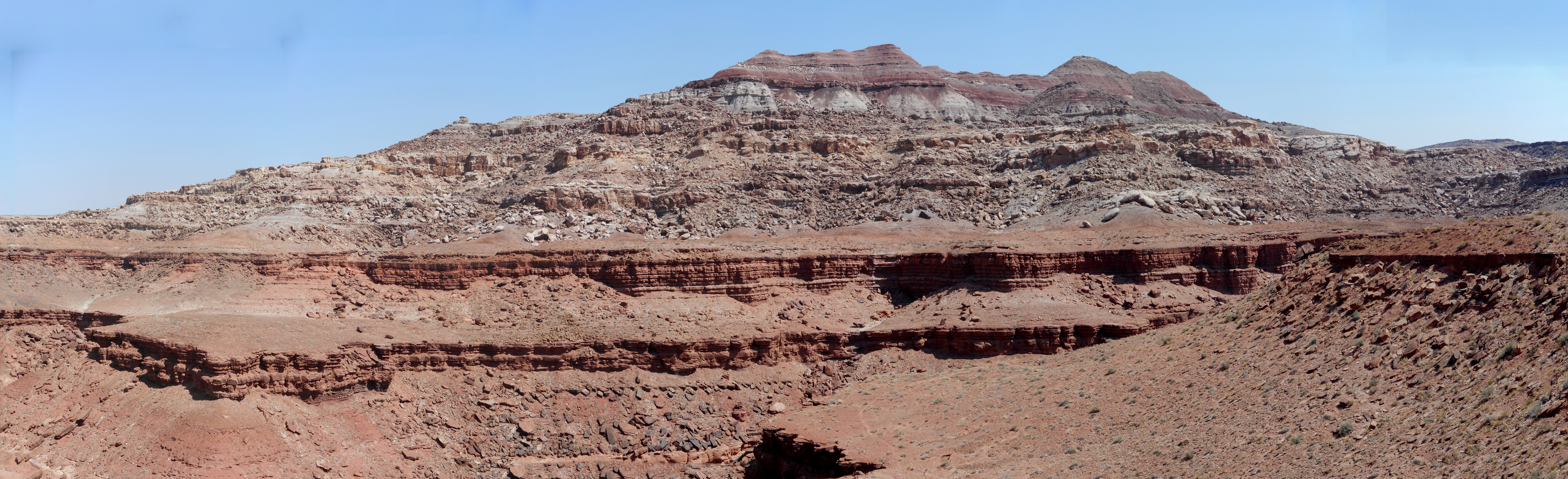
Type locality of the Salt Wash Member near White Wash, Grand County, Utah. The Morrison Formation is underlain by the brick-red Summerville Formation.

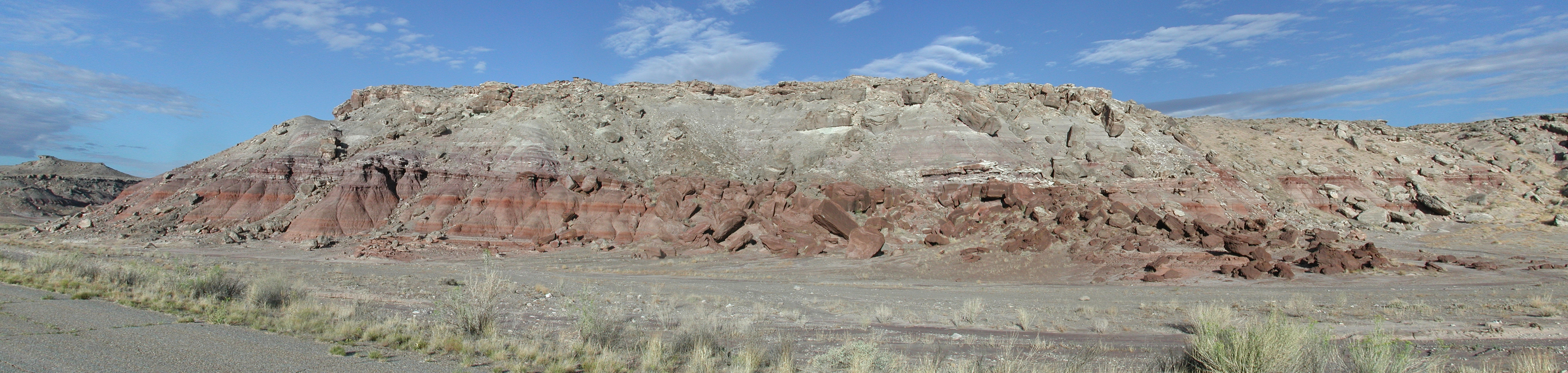
The Jurassic-Cretaceous boundary is seen where the red and purple beds of the Morrison Formation abruptly contact the drab, gray bed of the overlying Cedar Mountain Formation. The contact is the K1 unconformity. Jessie's Twist, southwest of Green River City, Utah.

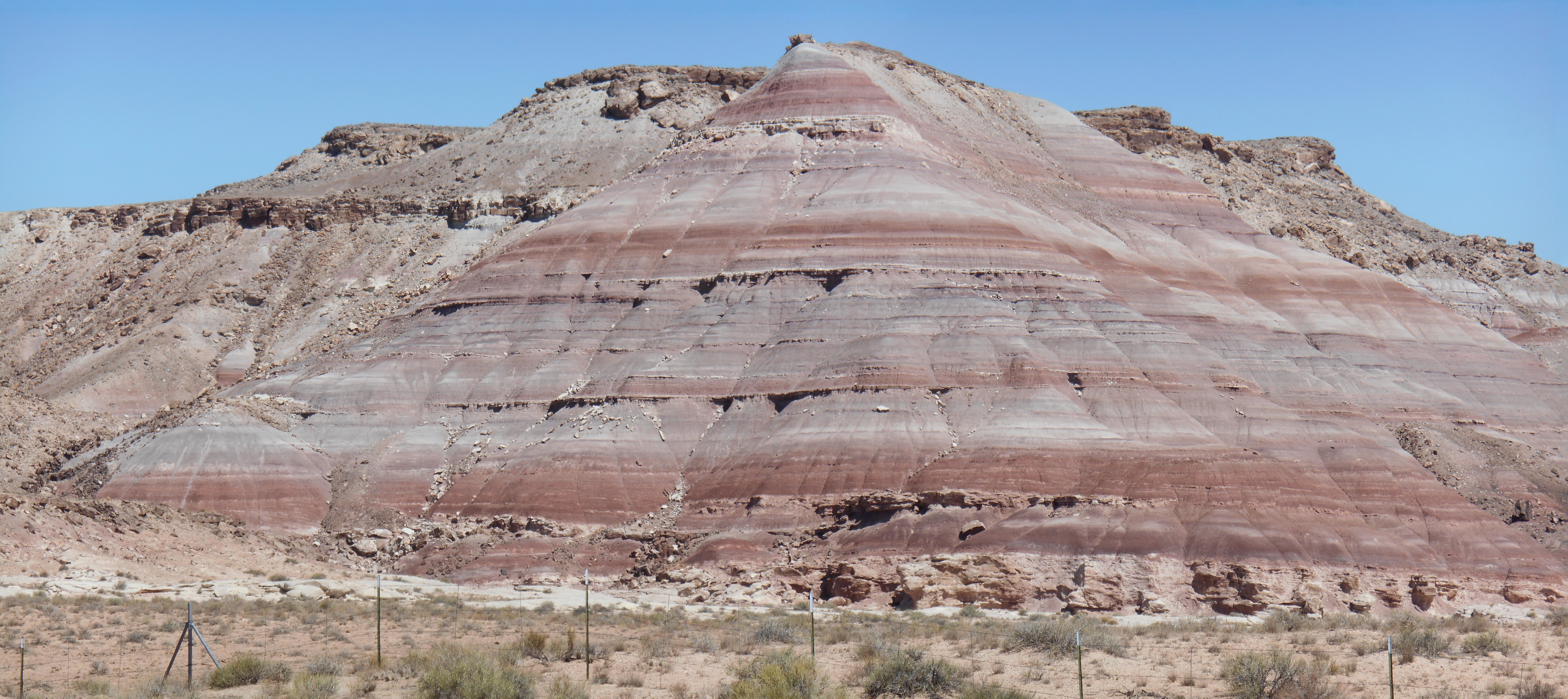
Brushy Basin Member showing the purple and red colors of paleosols (ancient soils). East side of the San Rafael Swell, Emery County, Utah.

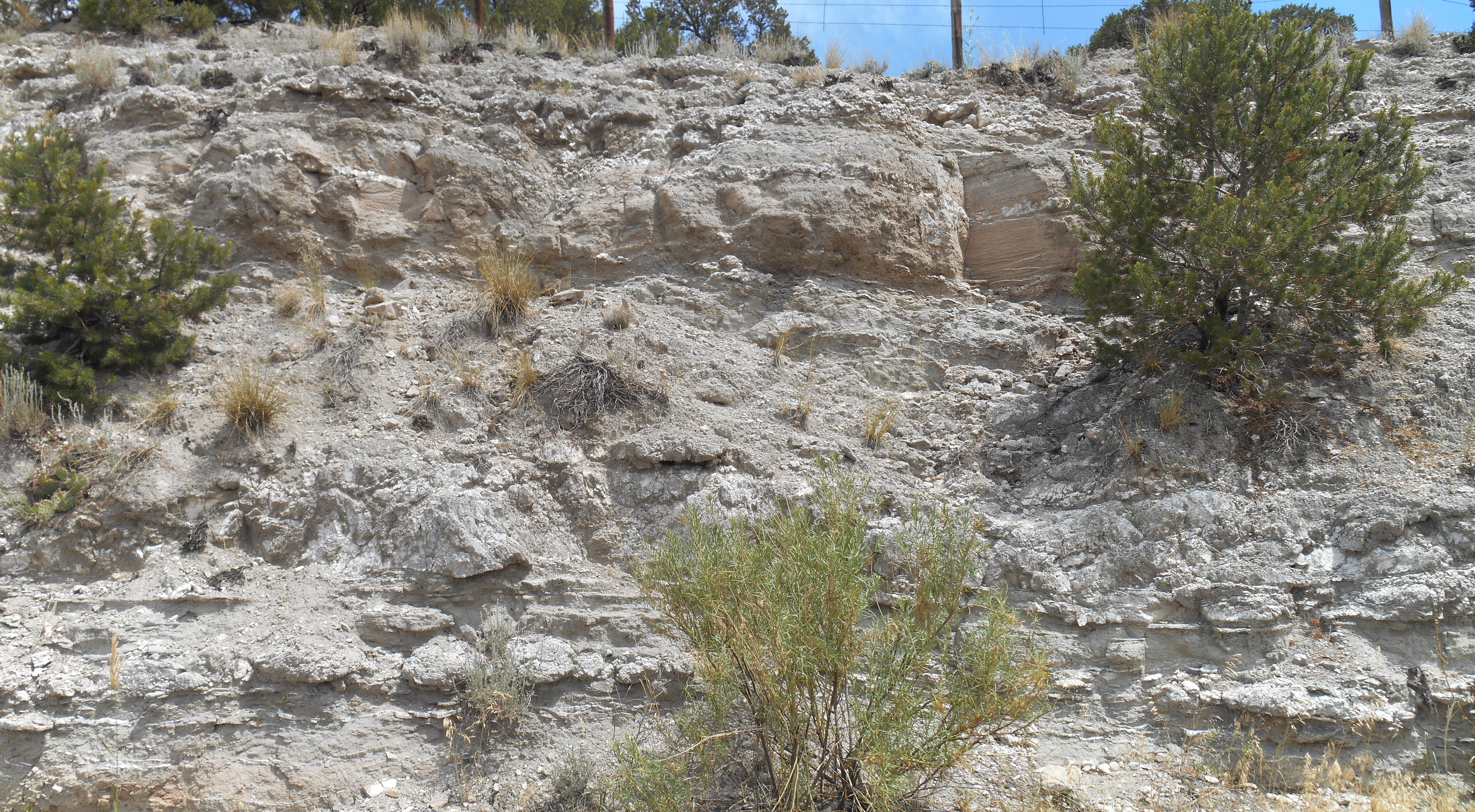
Gypsiferous facies of the Ralston Creek Member exposed in a road cut, Fremont County, Colorado.

The Morrison Formation is subdivided into several members, the occurrence of which are varied across the geographic extent of the Morrison. Members are (in alphabetical order):

- Bluff Sandstone Member (AZ, CO, NM, UT): Well-sorted, light brown to white sandstone with large grains and components of chert. Interpreted as being deposited in an aeolian setting, at the edge of a dune field.

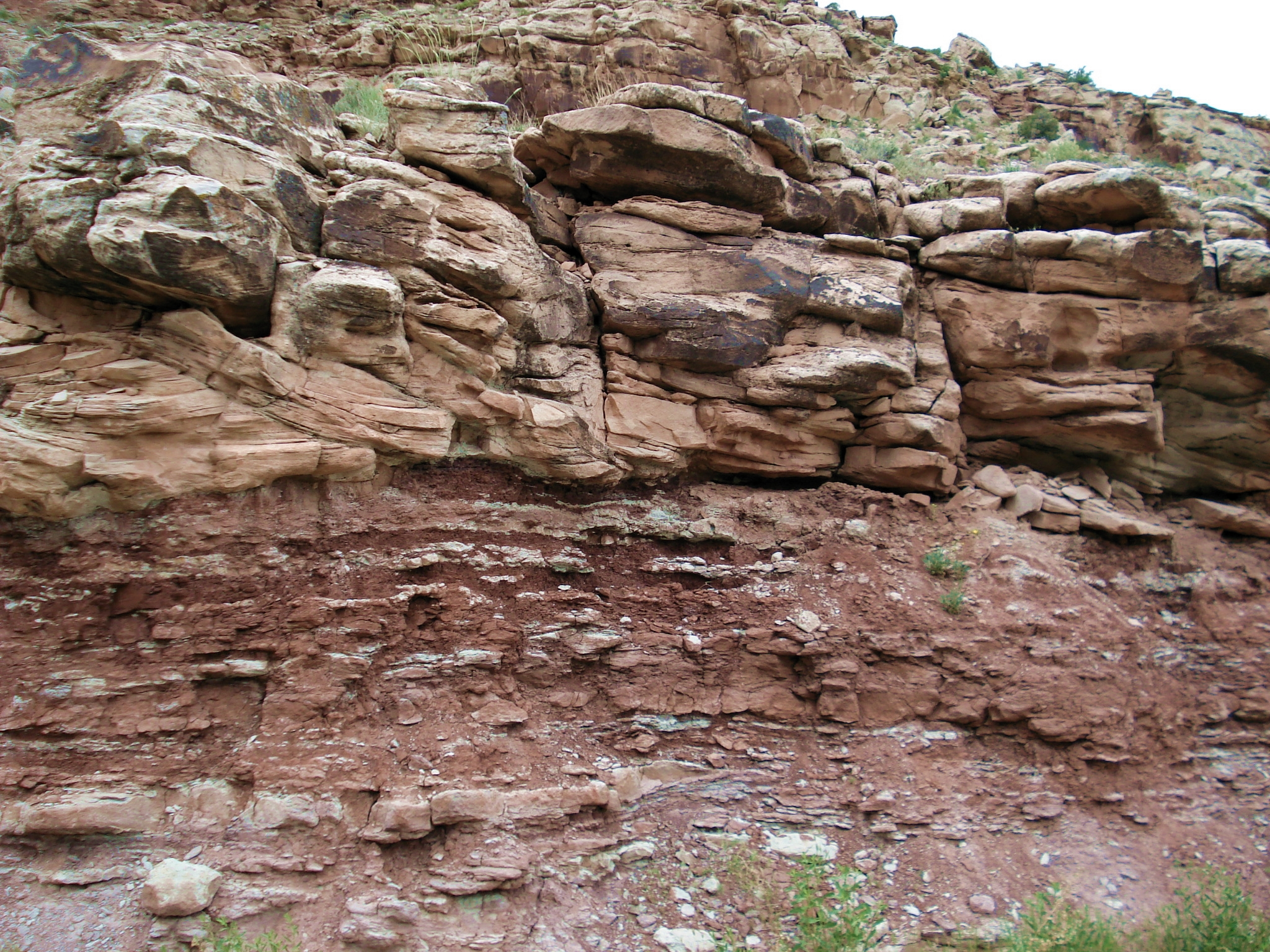
Reddish mudstones of the Tidwell Member underlying the whitish sandstones of the Saltwash Member, south of Cisco, Utah.

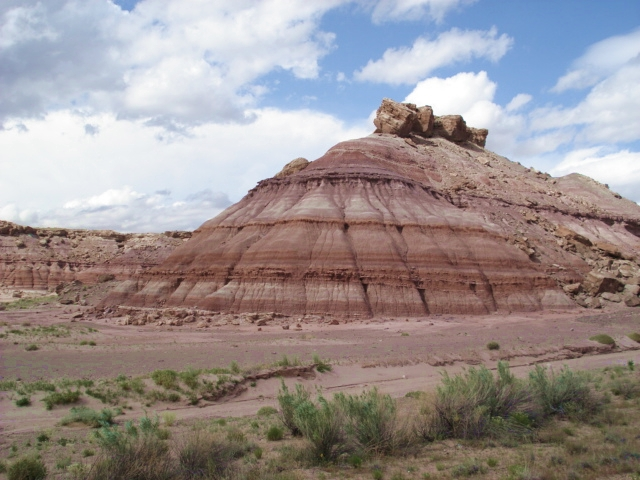
Brushy Basin Member on the Colorado Plateau

- Brushy Basin Member (AZ, CO, NM, UT): conglomerate interbedded with mudstone; up to fifty percent by volume is made up of altered vitric ash, which originated as felsic ash falls. Deposition likely occurred in a fluvial-lacustrine environment, with the lacustrine component tending towards playas.
- Fiftymile Member (UT): Mainly present in the Kaiparowits basin, consisting of interbedded sandstone and mudstone, with minimal conglomerate. Locally, it is the uppermost member and has contact with the Dakota Formation.
- Jackpile Sandstone Member (NM): primarily a whitish crossbedded subarkose sandstone with a clay matrix. It is interbedded with variegated, pale-green to red, bentonitic mudstone lenses. However, recent detrital zircon geochronology results have suggested that the Jackpile Sandstone Member is part of the Burro Canyon Formation.
- Ralston Creek Member (CO): formerly a considered separate formation and recently reclassified as the basal member of the Morrison in eastern Colorado. It appears analogous to the Tidwell and Salt Wash Members. This reclassification is supported by more detailed examination of the contacts and radiometric dating. The Ralston Creek contains conglomerate, sandstone, gypsum-mudstone, and gypsum-sandstone-mudstone facies; it is undetermined if the gypsum is of marine or lacustrine origin.
- Recapture Member (AZ, CO, NM, UT): forms the bottom of the Morrison across most of its range, overlying the Entrada and Wanakah Formations. Consists of clayey sandstone and claystone, representing a fluvial setting, interbedded with purely aeolian sandstone facies; in places, it also contains a large (up to nineteen percent) of orthoclase feldspar inclusions.
- Salt Wash Member (CO, UT): composed of fluvial sandstone, with occasional conglomeratic tendencies.

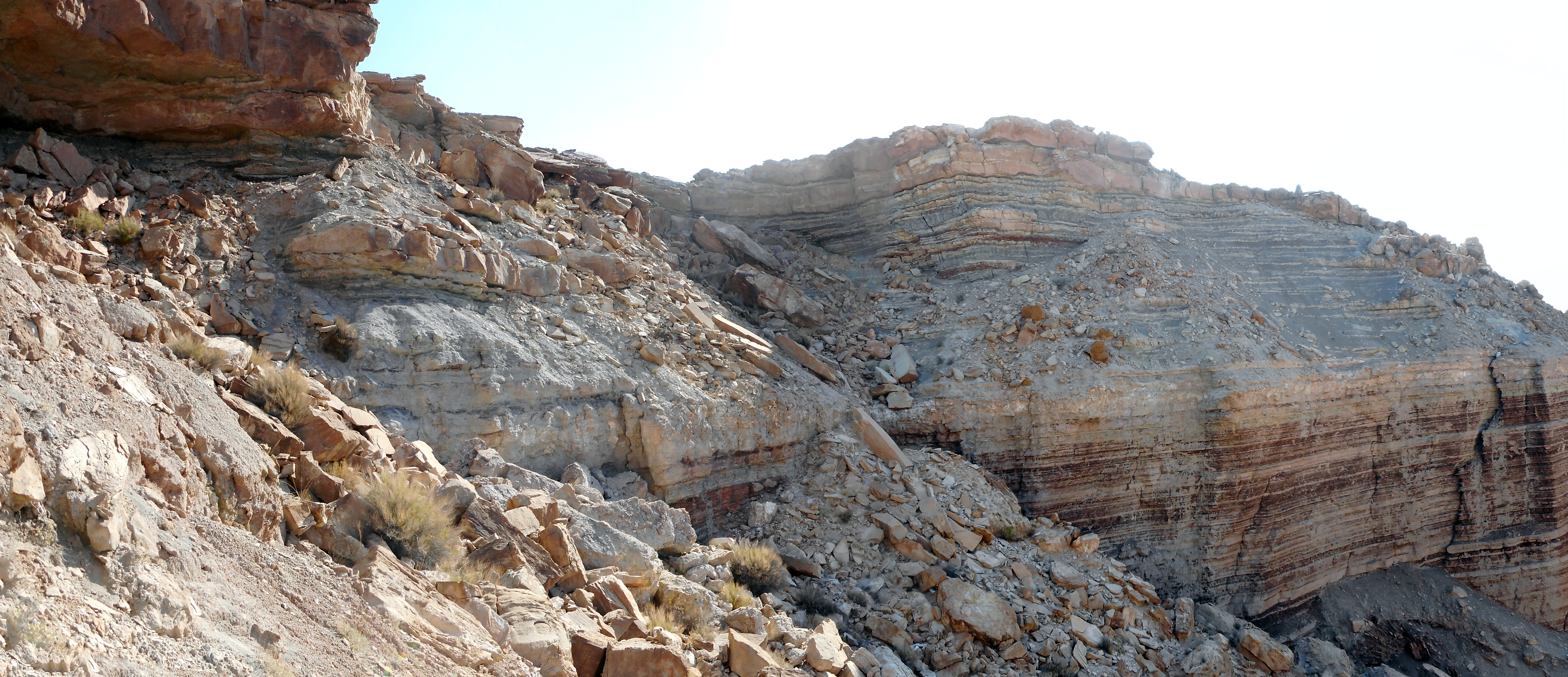
Tidwell Member at the type section, Shadscale Mesa, Emery County, Utah.

- Tidwell Member (AZ, CO, NM, UT): in the northern part of the Colorado Plateau, it is the basal member of the Morrison. Mainly composed of siltstone, shale, and sandstone, and occasionally incorporates limestone clasts, along with thin beds of limestone. Depositional environments range from mudflats to fluvial, to evaporate and lacustrine. The Morrison as a whole resembles the Tidwell.
- Unkpapa Sandstone Member (SD): occurs primarily in western South Dakota as a well-sorted, fine-grained sandstone, consisting primarily of quartz, with some feldspar inclusions. Locally overlain by the Lakota Formation or the main body of the Morrison, and overlies the Redwater Shale Member of the Sundance Formation. Occasionally referred to as a separate formation, chiefly within the Black Hills region.
- Westwater Canyon Member (AZ, CO, NM, UT): consists of sandstone interbedded with mudstone lenses and the occasional conglomerate component. Deposited in a braided-stream environment, high in organic matter. The term "Poison Canyon Sandstone" is informally applied to the upper sandstone sections of the member. The Westwater Canyon Member is the main source of uranium ore in the Morrison, especially in the San Juan Basin.
- Windy Hill Member (CO, SD, UT, WY): Formerly included as the upper member of the Sundance Formation, as, like the rest of the Sundance, it was deposited in marine settings; however, it is separated by an unconformity and interfingers with the Morrison, meriting the nomenclature shift. Composed of limey, fossiliferous sandstone, generally interpreted to be deposited in a marine setting.

"Popcorn" texture due to bentonite, formed from volcanic ash, characterizes the Brushy Basin Member

Other informal or disused designations of the Morrison include the Stockett Bed in Montana, an unofficial sub-unit which contains bituminous coal; the outdated terms Casamero, Chavez, and Prewitt Sandstone for the Brushy Basin, Recapture, and Westwater Canyon, respectively; and the Bullington Member, which has been discarded entirely.

== Fossil content ==
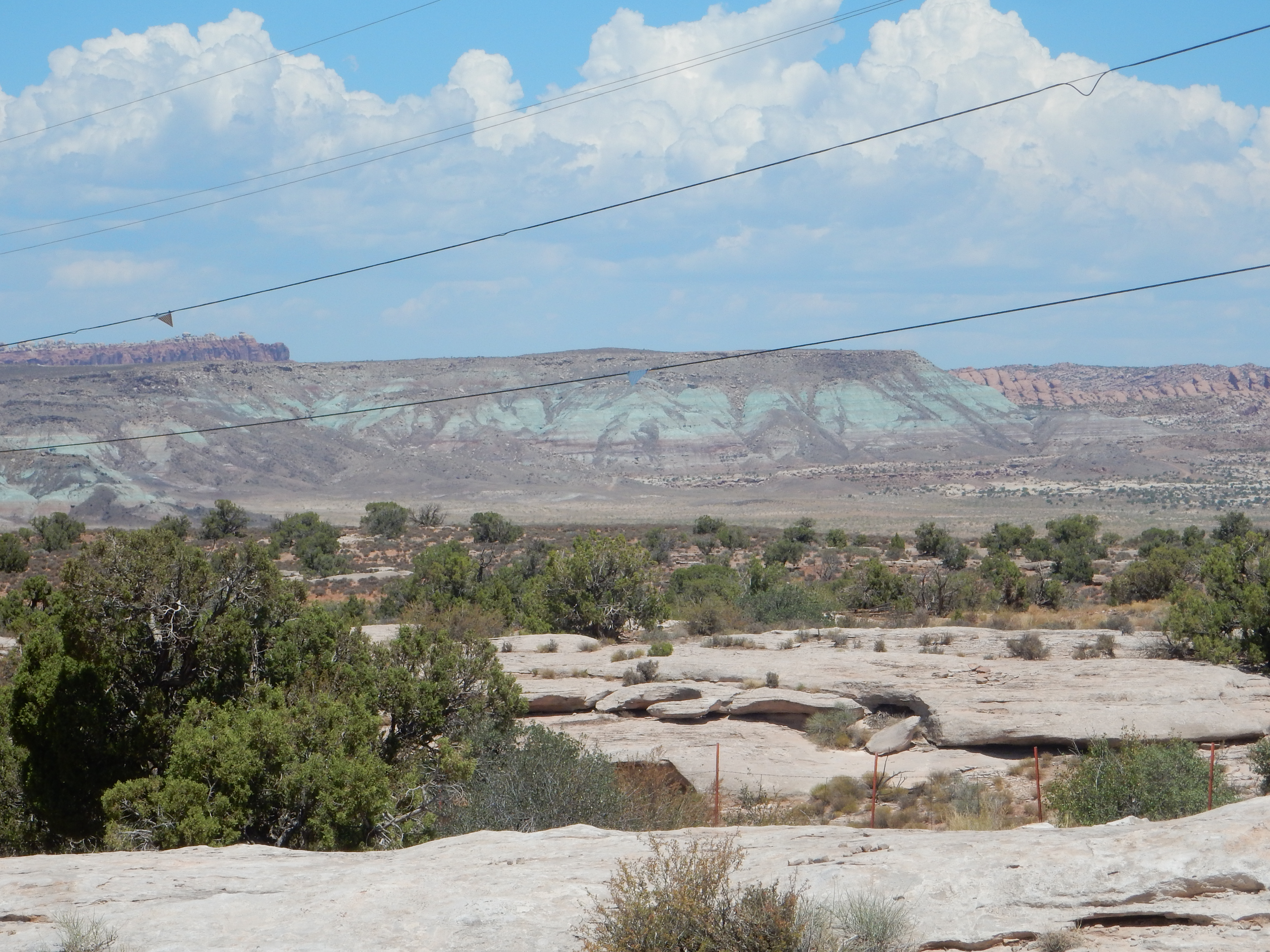
Bluish beds of the Brushy Basin Member containing alkali minerals deposited in Lake T'oo'dichi'

Though many of the Morrison Formation fossils are fragmentary, they are sufficient to provide a good picture of the flora and fauna in the Morrison Basin during the Kimmeridgian. Overall, the climate was dry, similar to a savanna but, since there were no angiosperms (grasses, flowers, and some trees), the flora was quite different. Conifers, the dominant plants of the time, were to be found with ginkgos, cycads, tree ferns, and horsetail rushes. Much of the fossilized vegetation was riparian, living along the river flood plains. Along the rivers, there were fish, frogs, salamanders, lizards, crocodiles, turtles, pterosaurs, crayfish, clams, and mammaliforms.

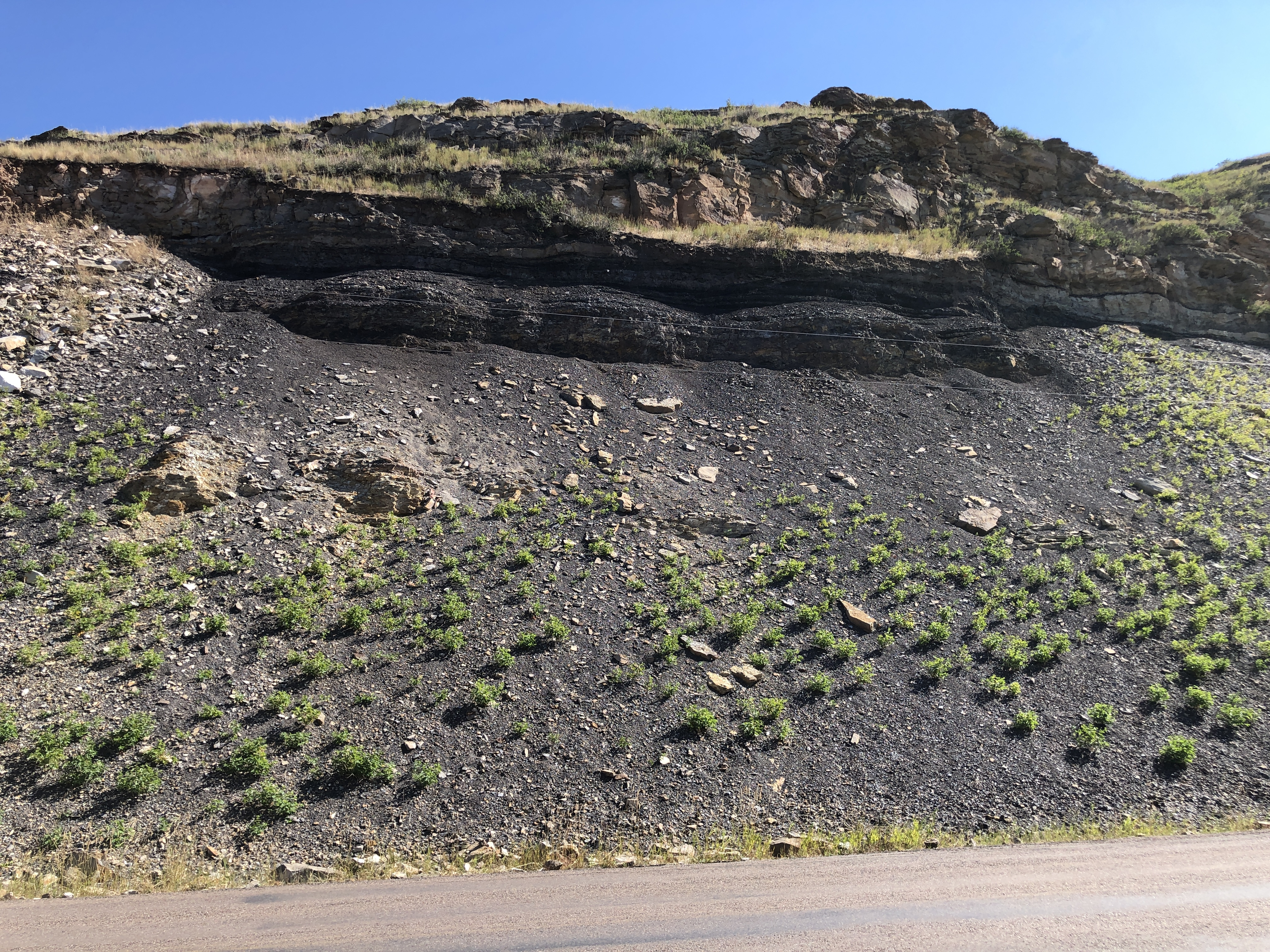
Coal seam in the Morrison Formation, Belt, Montana

The dinosaurs were most likely riparian, as well. Hundreds of dinosaur fossils have been discovered, such as Allosaurus, Ceratosaurus, Torvosaurus, Camptosaurus, Ornitholestes, several stegosaurs comprising at least two species of Stegosaurus and the slightly older Hesperosaurus, and the early ankylosaurs, Mymoorapelta and Gargoyleosaurus, most notably a very broad range of sauropods (the giants of the Mesozoic era). Since at least some of these species are known to have nested in the area (Camptosaurus embryoes have been discovered), there are indications that it was a good environment for dinosaurs and not just home to migratory, seasonal populations. However, the large body mass of the sauropods has been interpreted as an adaptation to migration in times of drought.

Sauropods that have been discovered include Diplodocus (most famously, the first nearly complete specimen of D. carnegii, which is now exhibited at the Carnegie Museum of Natural History, in Pittsburgh, Pennsylvania), Camarasaurus (the most commonly found sauropod), Brachiosaurus, Apatosaurus, Brontosaurus, Barosaurus, the uncommon Haplocanthosaurus and Supersaurus. The very diversity of the sauropods has raised some questions about how they could all co-exist. While their body shapes are very similar (long neck, long tail, huge elephant-like body), they are assumed to have had very different feeding strategies, in order for all to have existed in the same time frame and similar environment.

=== Sites and quarries ===
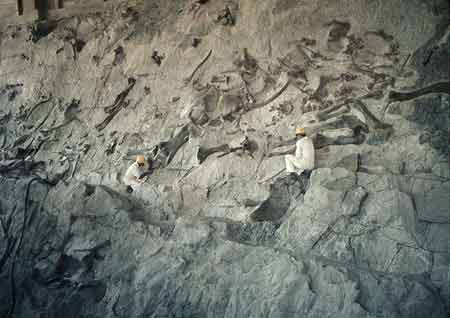
Workers inside the Dinosaur Quarry building, at the Dinosaur National Monument

Locations where significant Morrison Formation fossil discoveries have been made include:

==== Colorado ====
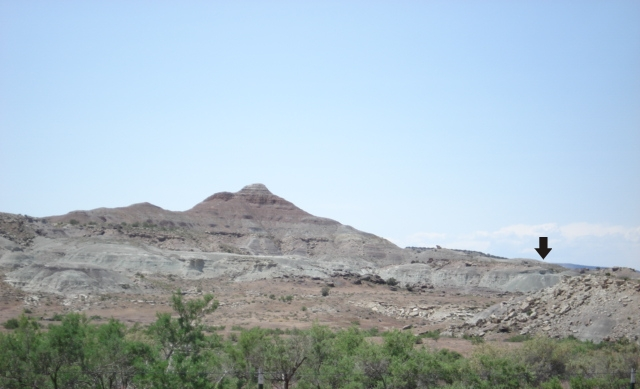
Fruita Paleontological Resource Area. One of the sites is denoted by the arrow.

- Garden Park, Colorado: One of the three major sites excavated by the paleontologists Othniel Charles Marsh and Edward Drinker Cope during the Bone Wars in 1877, though most of the specimens were too incomplete to classify (nomina dubia) during the 1877-78 field seasons. The first nearly complete skeletons of Stegosaurus, Ceratosaurus, and Allosaurus were discovered at the site, including the type specimens of the former two and the proposed neotype of Allosaurus fragilis, in the 1883-1886 Yale field seasons. In 1992, a specimen of Stegosaurus stenops was discovered with its armor still in place, which confirmed that the dinosaur had two rows of plates on its back.
- Dry Mesa Quarry, Colorado: A wide variety of fauna, as well as the most diverse set of dinosaurs from any Morrison Formation quarry. The first dig was in 1972, by researchers from Brigham Young University. Unique specimens include the longest dinosaur known, Supersaurus, the chimeric Ultrasauros, and the largest carnivore on the continent, Torvosaurus.
- Fruita Paleontological Resource Area: Badlands sites located south of Fruita, were actively worked by George Callison from California State University and the Los Angeles County Museum of Natural History. Numerous specimens of mammals, lizards, and crocodiles were found. Most recently, Fruitafossor windscheffeli and Fruitadens were described from the area.
- Purgatoire River track site, Otero County.

==== Utah ====
- Cleveland-Lloyd Dinosaur Quarry, Utah: First excavated by geologists from the University of Utah in the late 1920s. William Lee Stokes led an expedition from Princeton in 1939. During the Jurassic, the quarry was likely an ephemeral pond, where dinosaurs gathered and died due to severe drought. Their bodies were reworked by seasonal flooding events, which also added other partial carcasses from elsewhere. Allosaurus fragilis is by far the most common dinosaur at this site, making it a model organism for studies of paleobiology in basal theropods. The rare theropods Stokesosaurus and Marshosaurus specimens were also first discovered here.
- Dinosaur National Monument, Utah: First excavated by Earl Douglas working for the Carnegie Museum in 1909 with the purpose of finding sauropods from the Morrison Formation for public display. Monument also has fossilized dinosaurs from the Cedar Mountain Formation.
- Hanksville-Burpee Quarry, Hanksville

==== Wyoming ====
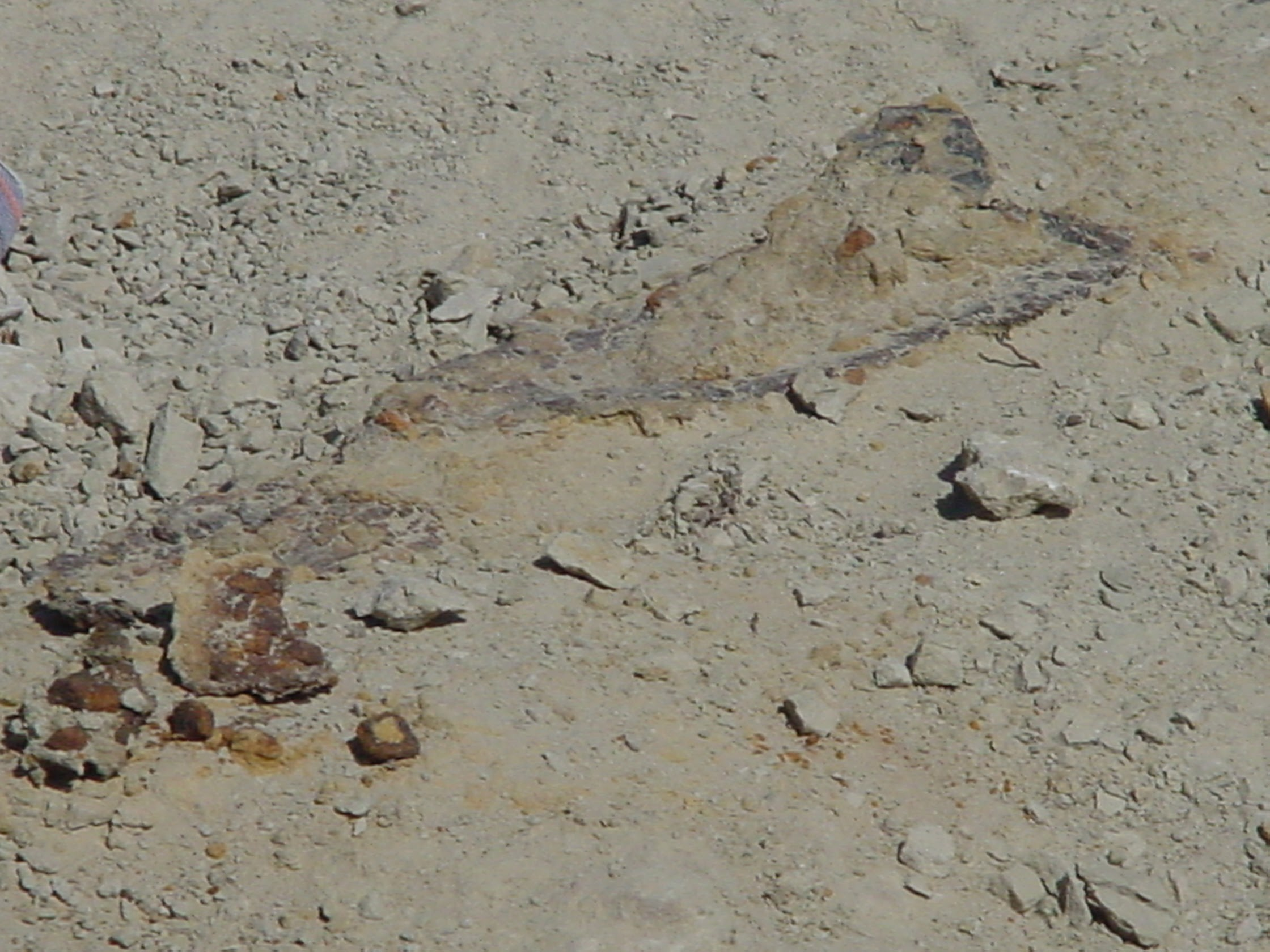
Stegosaurus dorsal plates being exposed during excavation at a quarry near Shell, Wyoming, 2004

- Bone Cabin Quarry, Wyoming
- Como Bluff, Wyoming: One of the most renowned fossil sites in North America. It was first worked by Cope and particularly Marsh in 1877 and has been the source of many different sauropods and non-dinosaur species. The Cloverly Formation from the Cretaceous and some Triassic strata are also exposed at this location.
- Red Canyon Ranch, near Shell, Wyoming: source of an exceptionally complete Stegosaurus stenops excavated in 2003–2004, now on display at the Natural History Museum, London.
- The Wyoming Dinosaur Center, Thermopolis
- Ten Sleep, including Dana Quarry from where at least 12 sauropods and theropods are recovered.

==== Montana ====
- Mother's Day Quarry, Carbon County

== Economic geology ==
The Morrison Formation contains uranium deposits, including the Jackpile uranium body discovered near Grants, New Mexico in 1951. The ore deposits in the rich Grants mineral belt are concentrated in sandstone beds of the Westwater Canyon Member and the Jackpile Member. Mines in this belt produced 340,000,000 pounds (150,000,000 kg) of U_{3}O_{8} between 1948 and 2002. The uranium was precipitated by plant debris and humate that acted as reducing agents.

== See also ==
- Chugwater Formation
- Lists of dinosaur-bearing stratigraphic units
- List of fossil sites (with link directory)
- List of Paleobiota of the Morrison Formation
- Uranium mining and the Navajo people
