= Burro Canyon Formation =

Geologic formation in the southwestern US

- Stratigraphic range: Early Cretaceous
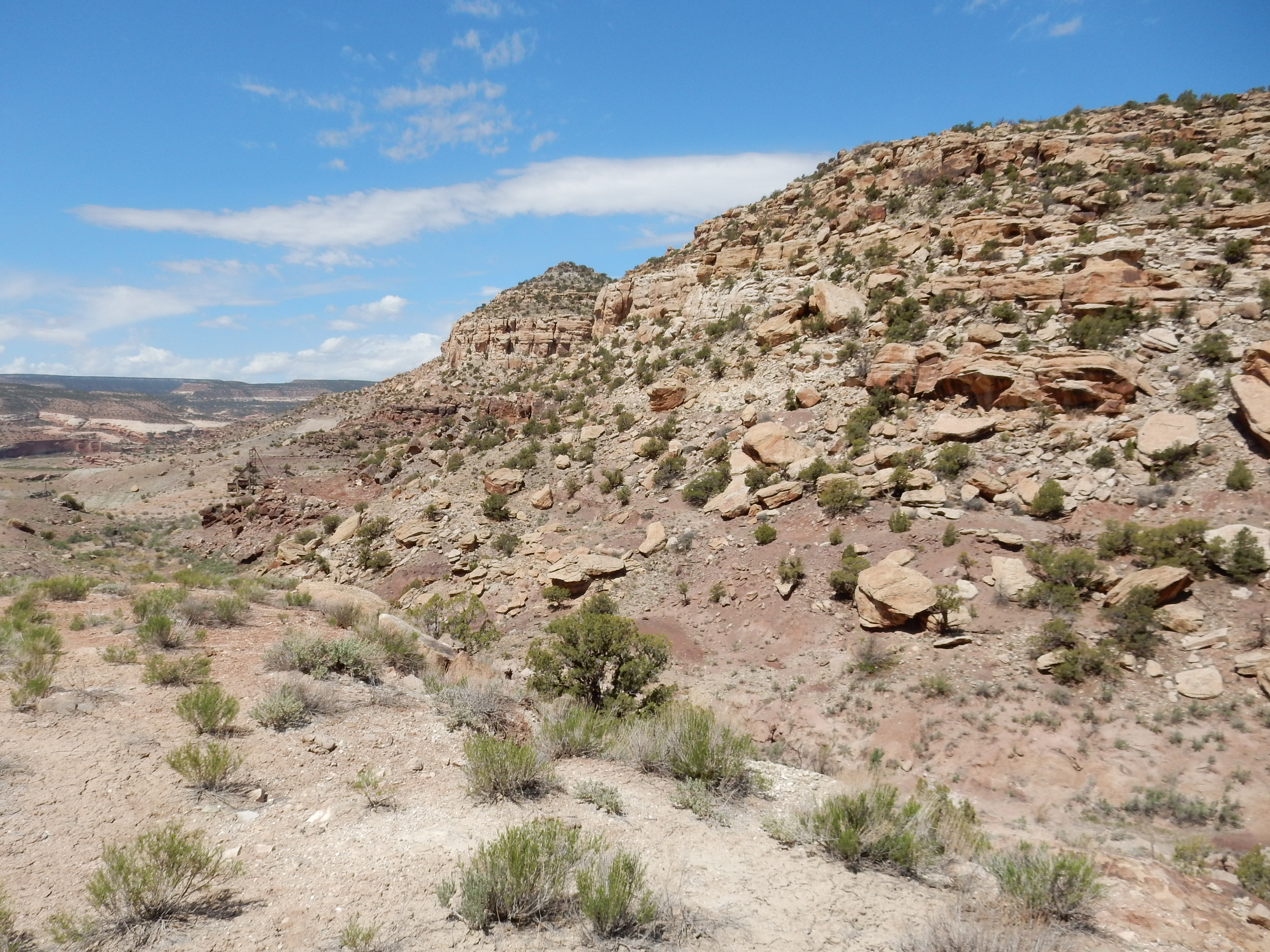
- Burro Canyon Formation at its type section at Burro Canyon, near Slick Rock, Colorado
- Type: Formation
- Underlies: Dakota Formation
- Overlies: Morrison Formation
- Thickness: 0–180 feet (0–55 m)

Lithology
- Primary: Conglomeratic sandstone
- Other: Mudstone

Location
- Coordinates: 38.047530°N 108.8782°W
- Region: Colorado, New Mexico, Utah
- Country: United States

Type section
- Named for: Burro Canyon, San Miguel County, Colorado
- Named by: W.L. Stokes and D.A. Phoenix
- Year defined: 1948
- Burro Canyon Formation (the United States) Burro Canyon Formation (Colorado)

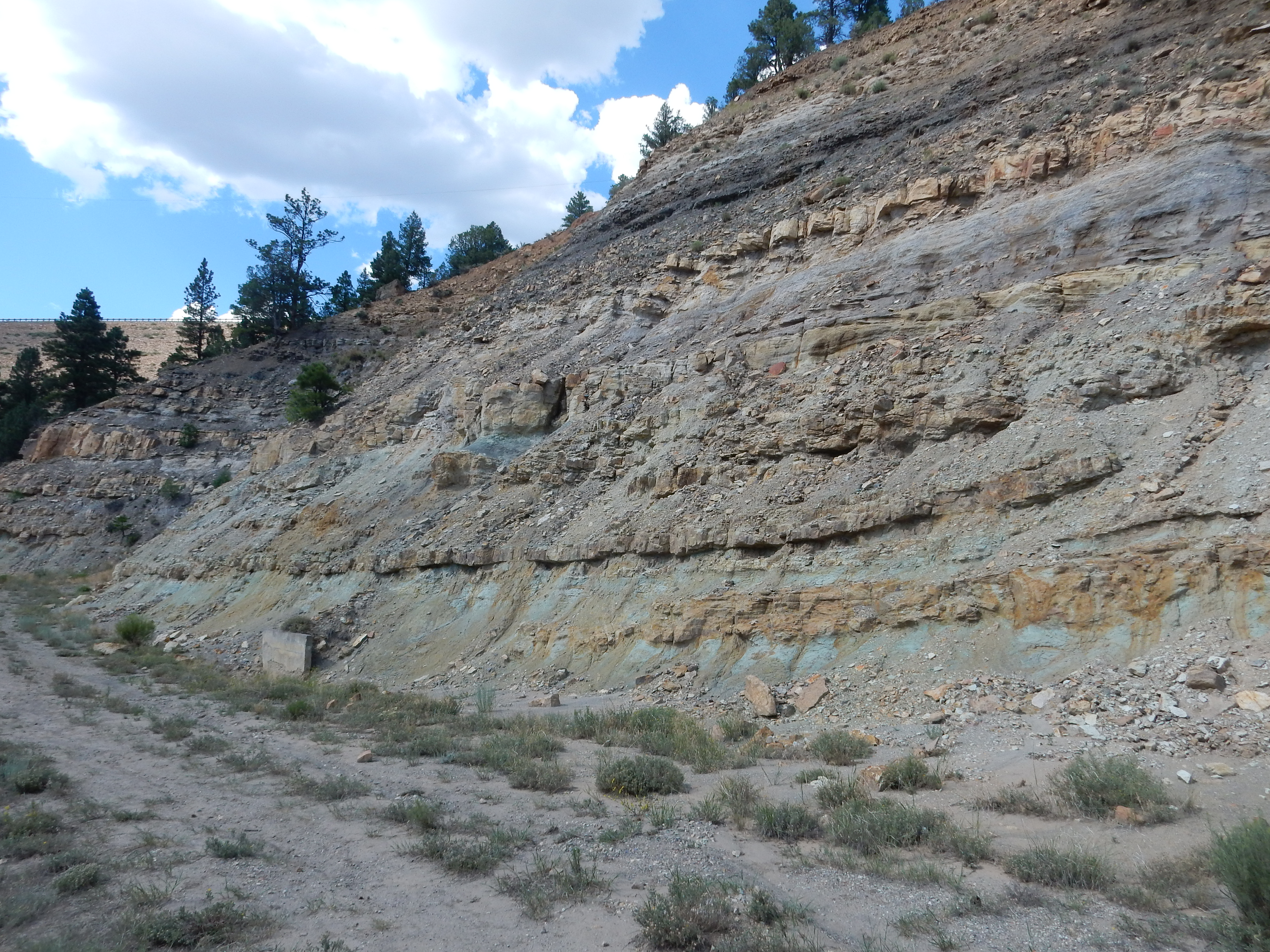
Burro Canyon Formation in spillway of Heron Lake (New Mexico)

The Burro Canyon Formation is an Early Cretaceous Period sedimentary geologic formation, found in western Colorado, the Chama Basin and eastern San Juan Basin of northern New Mexico, and in eastern Utah, US.

== Description ==
The lithology of the Burro Canyon Formation is dominated by medium- to fine-grained sandstone, much of which has rounded chert and quartz pebbles above scour surfaces. The Burro Canyon Formation was deposited in a braided-stream system.

The formation overlies the Morrison Formation, with the boundary placed at the first conglomeratic sandstone bed. It underlies the Dakota Formation, from which it is distinguished by the presence of green mudstone and the absence of carbonaceous material. It is similar to the Cedar Mountain Formation on the west side of the Colorado River and the two formations have been interpreted as interfingering alluvial fans from separate source regions. The Jackpile Member of the Morrison Formation may be its lateral equivalent.

== Fossils ==
Palynomorphs near the top of formation indicate a middle to late Early Cretaceous age. The formation also contains the pelecypod mollusks Protelliptio douglassi and Unio farri and the conifer Frenelopsis varians.

== Economic geology ==
The Burro Canyon Formation in the southern Chama Basin has been evaluated for its potential for uranium deposits. These are not economical to recover at 2020 prices.

== Investigative history ==
The formation was first named by W.L. Stokes and D.A. Phoenix in 1948 for exposures in Burro Canyon east of the Dolores River. Stokes concluded by 1952 that the formation is equivalent to the Cedar Mountain Formation, with which it is continuous near Dewey, Utah. Robert Fillmore considers the two formations to be distinct enough to warrant retaining the distinction in name, and puts the boundary along the Colorado River. E.R. Swift proposed the name Deadman's Peak Formation for similar beds in the Chama basin, but this was rejected by A.E. Saucier.

== See also ==
- List of fossiliferous stratigraphic units in Colorado
- List of fossiliferous stratigraphic units in New Mexico
- List of fossiliferous stratigraphic units in Utah
- Paleontology in Colorado
- Paleontology in New Mexico
- Paleontology in Utah
