= Summerville Formation =

Geologic formation in Four Corners region, US

- Stratigraphic range: Oxfordian; 161–151 Ma
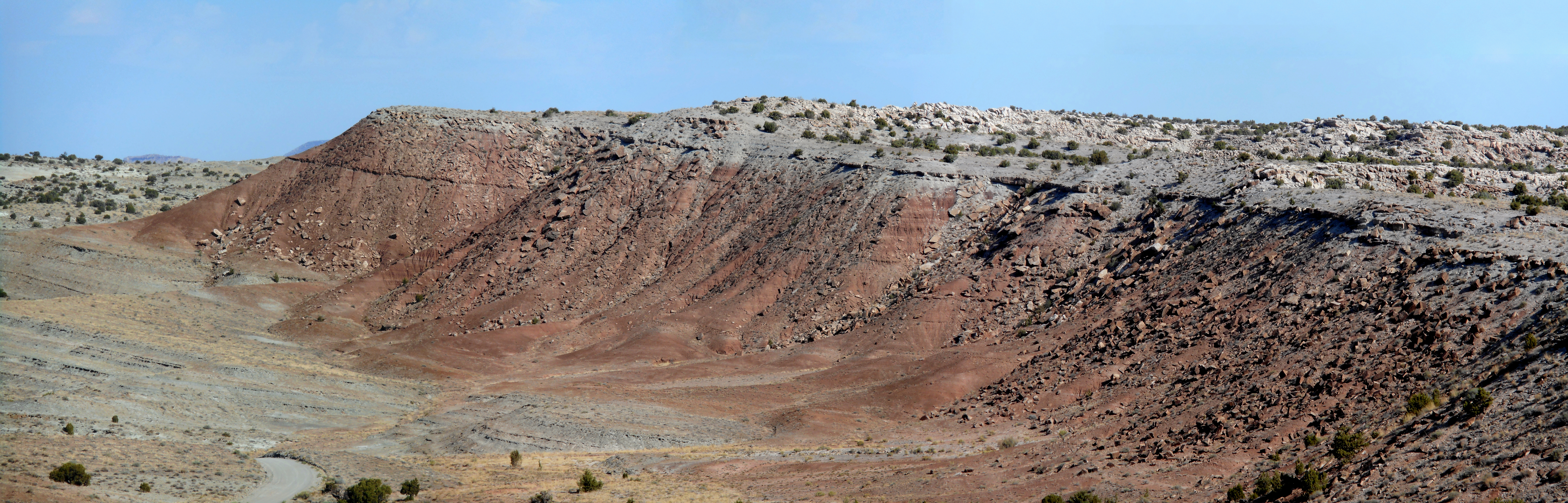
- Summerville Formation at the type locality at Summerville Point, east side of the San Rafael Swell, Emery County, Utah
- Type: Geological formation
- Unit of: San Rafael Group
- Sub-units: Bluff Sandstone
- Underlies: Morrison Formation
- Overlies: Todilto & Curtis Formations
- Thickness: 100 m (330 ft)

Lithology
- Primary: Mudstone, sandstone
- Other: Gypsum

Location
- Coordinates: 39.216°N 110.544°W
- Approximate paleocoordinates: 31.9°N 54.7°W
- Region: Four Corners, (Southwestern United States)
- Country: United States
- Extent: Henry Mountains, Paradox Basin

Type section
- Named for: Summerville Point, Emery County, Utah
- Named by: James Gilluly & J.B. Reeside Jr.
- Year defined: 1928
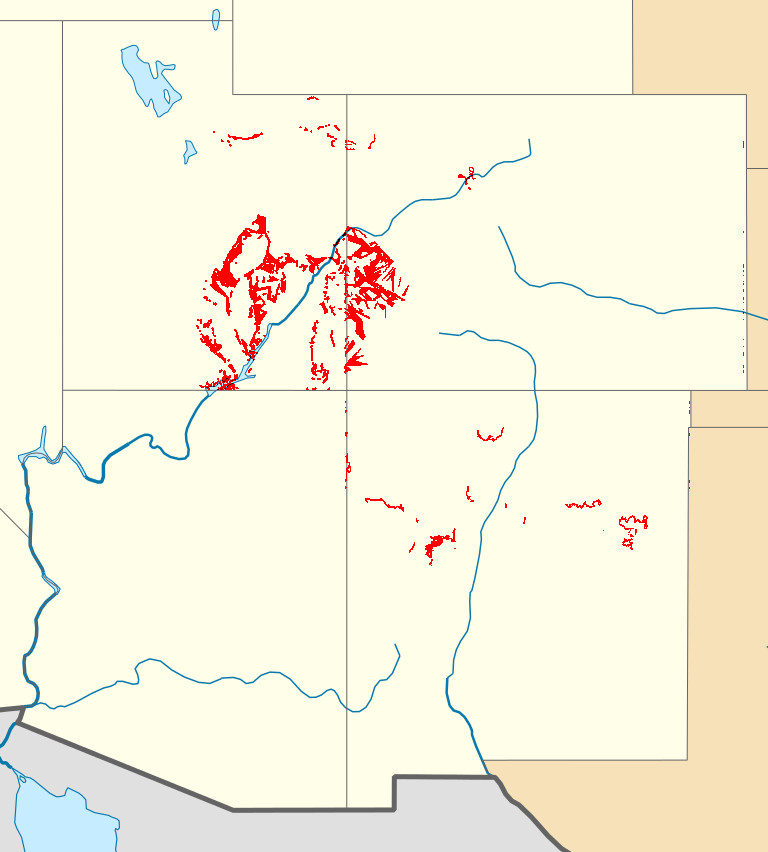
- Summerville Formation outcrops in Utah, Colorado and New Mexico

The Summerville Formation is a geological formation in New Mexico, Colorado, and Utah of the Southwestern United States. It dates back to the Oxfordian stage of the Late Jurassic.

== Description ==
The formation consists of up to 100 meters (330 ft) of red mudstone, with thin interbeds of green and red sandstone. The lower portion of the formation shows polygonal desiccation cracks and localized salt-hopper casts while the upper portion contains considerable gypsum, consistent with deposition in a sabkha on the margin of the Sundance Sea.It is exposed in the San Rafael Reef, the Waterpocket Fold, in the Henry Mountains, with additional exposures scattered across the region from the San Rafael Reef to the Paradox Basin, and in north-central New Mexico. The thin bedding is characteristic throughout the formation, but gypsum is not found in the San Juan Basin and some conglomerate is found on the south and southwestern margins of the formation. The correlation of late Jurassic beds in northwestern New Mexico with the Summerville Formation in Utah has been questioned, and it has been suggested that they be assigned to the Beclabito Formation instead.

The Summerville Formation rests conformably on the underlying Curtis Formation (Utah and western Colorado) or Todilto Formation (southwest Colorado and New Mexico) but is separated from the overlying Morrison Formation by the regional J5 unconformity. It thins significantly in the Moab-La Sal area, the likely area of the divide between the marine Curtis basin to the northwest and the salina lake Todilto basin to the southeast. Here the formation is just 1.2 meters (3.9 feet) thick and rests directly on Entrada Sandstone. In many locations the Summerville is separated from the Morrison by eolian sandstones, such as the Bluff Sandstone, variously assigned to the Morrison Formation or the San Rafael Group. The Morrison Formation represents a return to more humid conditions with increased clastic input.

The Bell Ranch Formation of northeastern New Mexico is correlative with the Summerville Formation.

The Summerville Formation is interpreted as recording a regression of the Sundance Sea to the north, with simultaneous infilling of both the Curtis and Todilto basins. This produced a depositional environment of very low relief, in which occasional encroachments of eolian sand during times of drought were subsequently worked into thin strata by wave action in ephemeral saline lakes.

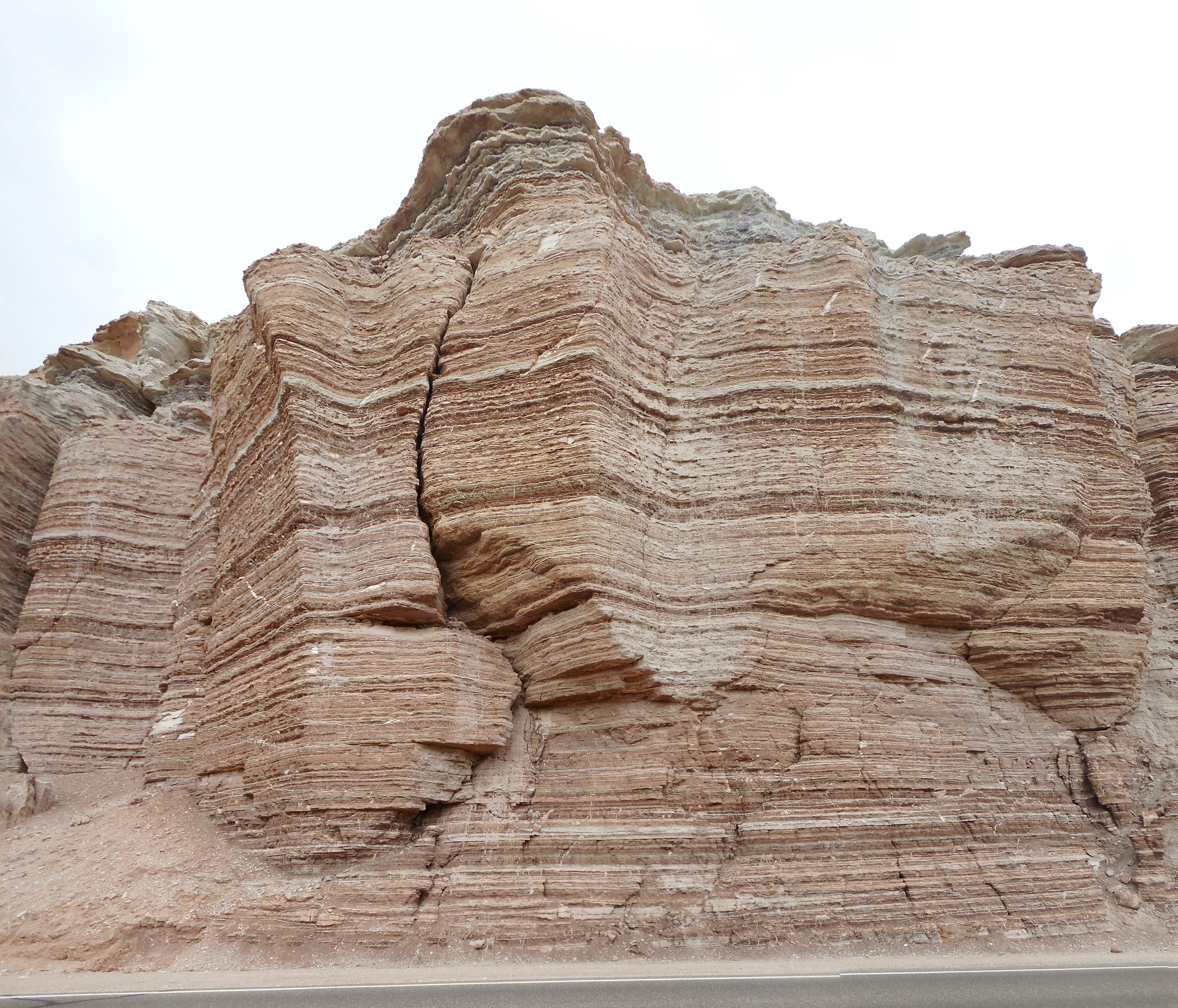
Evenly bedded Summerville Formation exposed along Utah Highway 24, 2.4 miles west of Hanksville, Utah

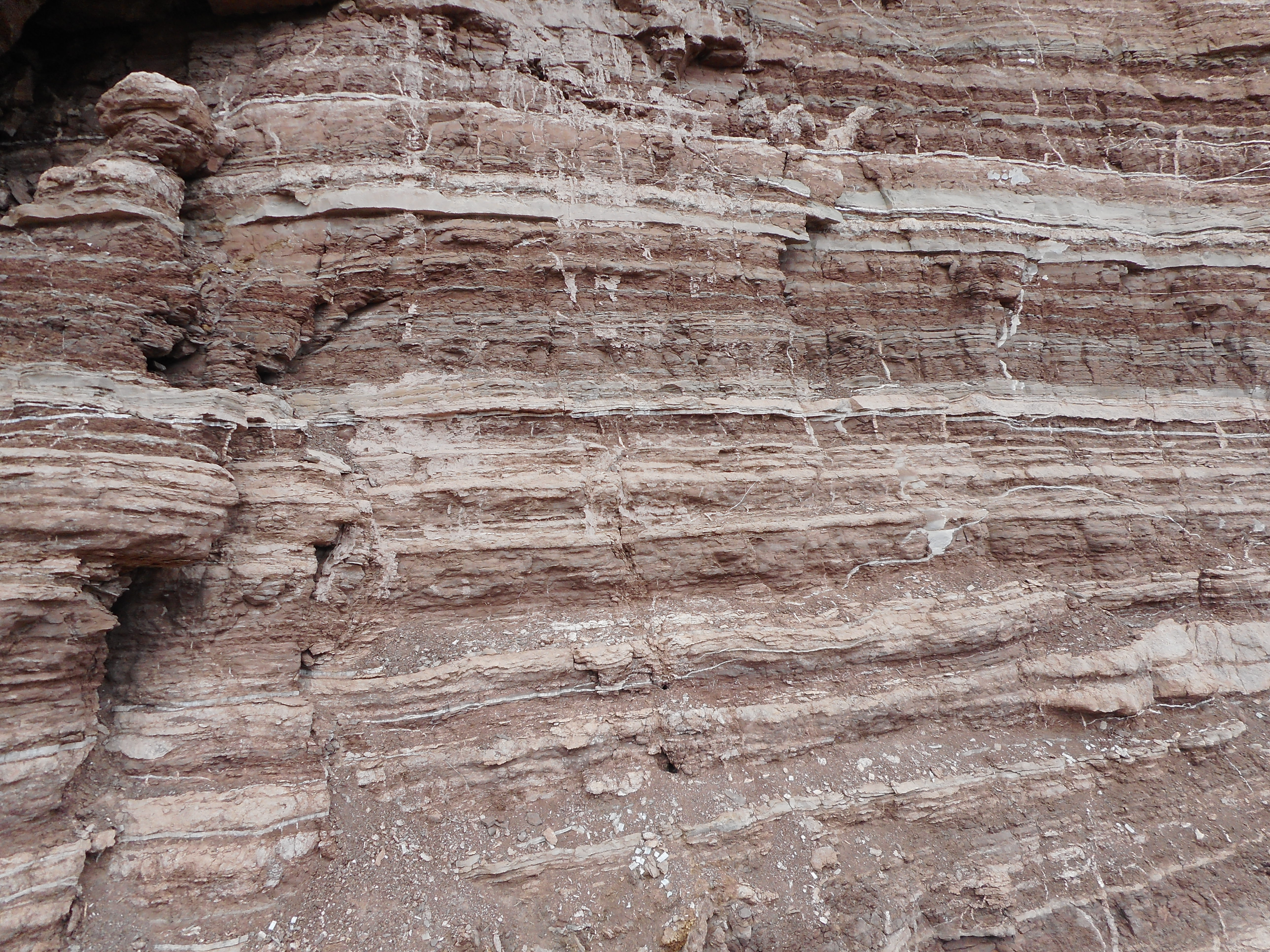
Closeup of the Summerville Formation showing even bedding, 2.4 miles west of Hanksville, Utah.

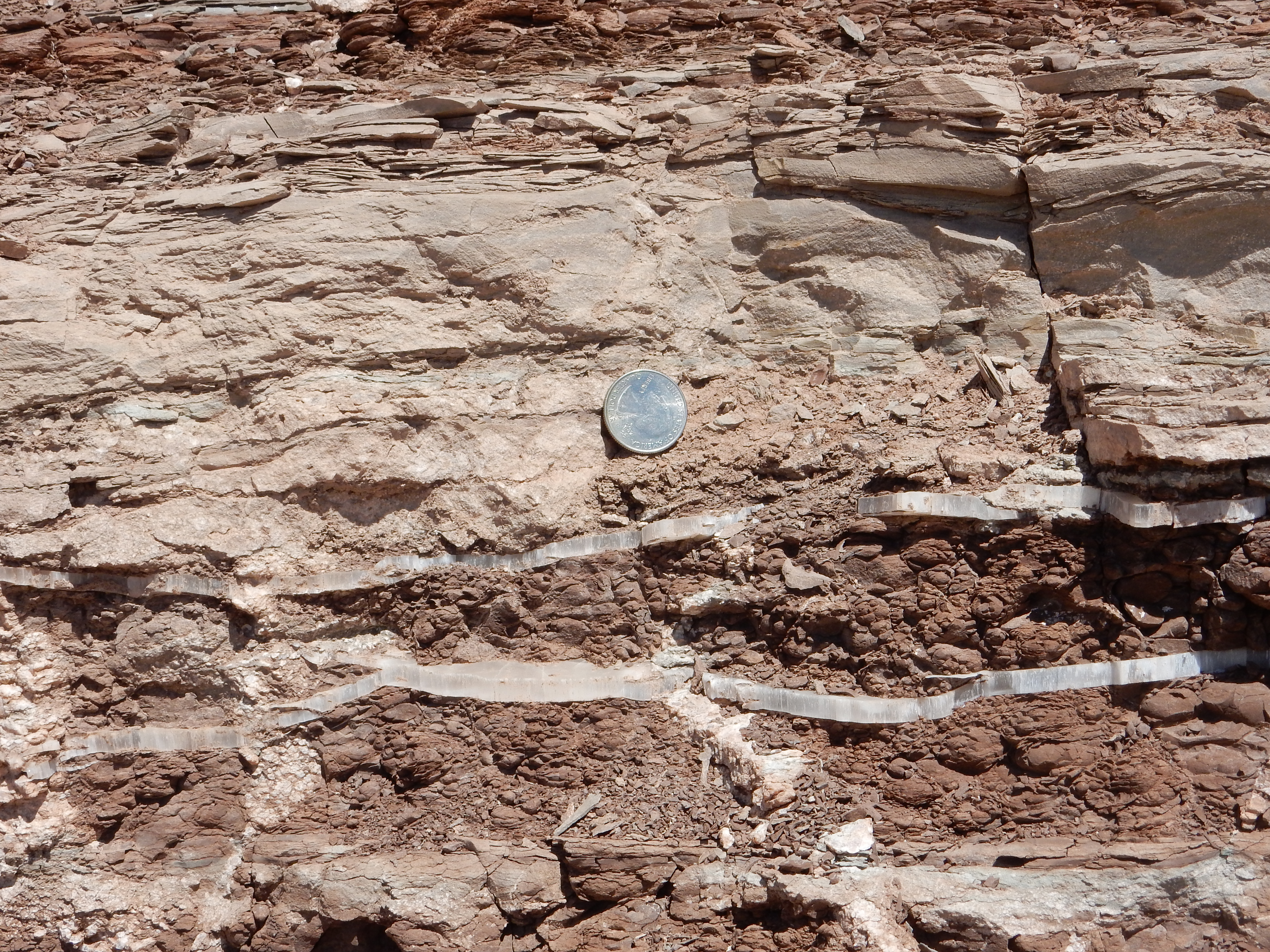
Summerville Formation with gypsum-filled cracks. U.S. quarter dollar (24 mm) for scale

== Fossil content ==
The formation is almost completely lacking in body fossils. However, theropod tracks were found in the formation in Utah, New Mexico, and Colorado.

=== Avemetatarsalians ===
Avemetatarsalians of the Summerville Formation
Genus	Species	Location	Stratigraphic position	Material	Notes	Images
Pteraichnus	P. saltwashensis	Arizona			Pterosaur trackways. Includes the P. saltwashensis type locale. Specimens housed at the University of Utah. These tracks may actually be from the Morrison Formation.	
Pteraichnus	Indeterminate	Arizona, near Summerville Also present in Colorado (Cactus Park, Furnish Canyon, Colorado National Monument) and Utah (Delmonte Mines, Starr Springs, Flaming Gorge, Ferron, Moab, Duchesne County).			Summerville, Furnish Canyon, Cactus Park, Delmonte Mines, Starr Springs, Ferron, and Moab specimens are housed in the University of Colorado's Dinosaur Tracks Museum in Denver. The Flaming Gorge and Colorado National Monument tracks remains in the field. Ferron specimens are also housed at the University of Utah.	

Color key: Taxon / Reclassified taxon / Taxon falsely reported as present / Dubious taxon or junior synonym / Ichnotaxon / Ootaxon / Morphotaxon	Notes; Uncertain or tentative taxa are in small text; ~~crossed out~~ taxa are discredited.

== History of investigation ==
The formation was first defined in 1928 for exposures in the San Rafael Reef. Similar beds in northeastern Arizona and the San Juan Basin are assigned to the Wanakah Formation, but continue to be assigned to the Summerville Formation in north-central New Mexico.

== See also ==
- List of dinosaur-bearing rock formations
- Geologic formations of the United States
