= Entrada Sandstone =

Geological formation in Utah, United States

- Stratigraphic range: Middle Jurassic
- Type of the Entrada Formation at Entrada Point, Emery County, Utah
- Type: Geological formation
- Sub-units: Cannonville Member, Cow Springs Member, Dewey Bridge Member, Escalante Member, Henrieville Member, EExeter Member, Gunsight Butte Member, Iyanbito Member, Moab Member, Red Mesa Member, Slick Rock Member
- Underlies: Curtis Formation; Todilto Formation
- Overlies: Carmel Formation

Lithology
- Primary: fluvial mudstone, siltstone, and eolian sandstone

Location
- Coordinates: 39.261°N 110.543°W
- Region: Colorado Plateau
- Country: United States

Type section
- Named for: Entrada Point, northern San Rafael Swell
- Named by: James Gilluly and J.B. Reeside, Jr. (1928)
- Entrada Sandstone (the United States) Entrada Sandstone (Utah)

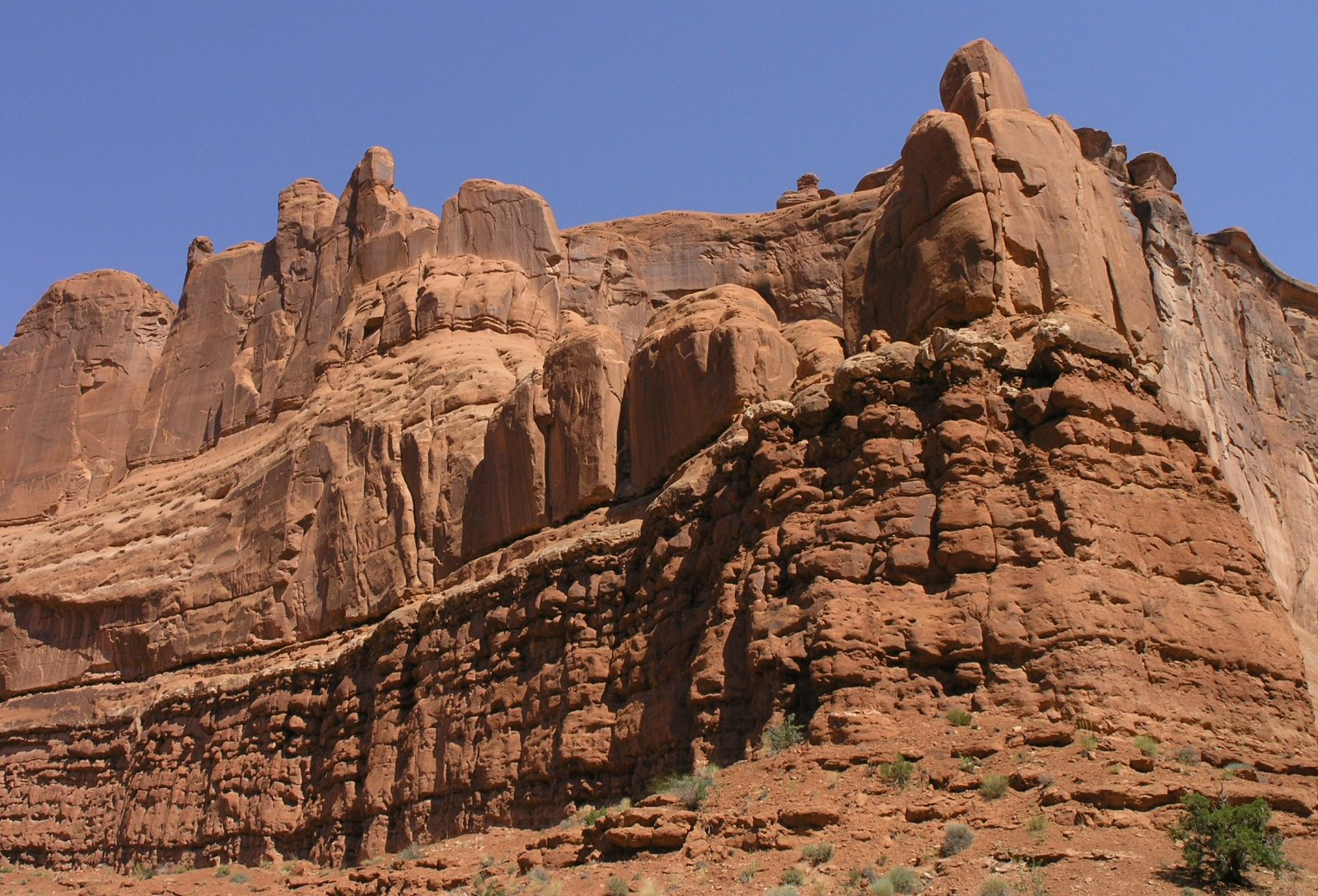
Entrada Sandstone conformably overlies the Carmel Formation, Park Avenue, Arches National Park

The Entrada Sandstone is a formation in the San Rafael Group found in the U.S. states of Wyoming, Colorado, northwest New Mexico, northeast Arizona, and southeast Utah. Part of the Colorado Plateau, this formation was deposited during the Jurassic Period sometime between 180 and 140 million years ago in various environments, including tidal mudflats, beaches, and sand dunes. The Middle Jurassic San Rafael Group was dominantly deposited as ergs (sand seas) in a desert environment around the shallow Sundance Sea.

== Description ==
At its type section at Entrada Point, located in the northern part the San Rafael Swell in Emery County, Utah, the Entrada consists of red silty sandstone and lesser interbedded mudstone and is a slope-forming formation. This part of the Entrada is sometimes described as the "earthy facies". Here the Entrada is overlain by the Curtis Formation, and overlies the Carmel Formation. To the south and east, the Entrada transitions to cliff-forming red or white crossbedded sandstone, sometimes called the "slickrock facies". This is actually more typical of the Entrada as a whole, and a principal reference section including both facies was designated by Peterson in 1988 at Pine Creek, 5 kilometers (3.1 mi) north of Escalante, Utah, in the Kaiparowits Basin.

At the reference section in the Kaiparowitz Basin, the Entrada is 314 meters (1,030 ft) thick and is divided into three informal members. The lower member is 113 meters (371 ft) of orange-red silty sandstone, with occasional beds of red mudstone, corresponding to the earthy facies. The middle member is 132 meters (433 ft) of red to green mudstone interbedded with red to white sandstone. The upper member is 69 meters (226 ft) of crossbedded white sandstone. The white color is attributed to bleaching by organic-rich fluids from overlying beds. The formation rests on the Carmel Formation and is overlain by the Morrison Formation.

In the Curtis Mountains region of northeastern Arizona, the Entrada is overlain by the Wanakah Formation.

In the San Juan Basin of northwestern New Mexico, the Entrada consists of upper and lower sandy members and a medial silty member, the Rehoboth Member. The Curtis Formation is sometimes absent and the Entrada then overlies Chinle Formation. It is overlain by the Todilto Formation. Southeast of Fort Defiance, Arizona, the lower sandy beds are assigned to the Iyanbito Member. Total thickness is up to 37 meters (121 ft).

In the Slick Rock, Colorado area, the Entrada is divided into a "middle sandstone", the Rehoboth Member, and the Slick Rock Member, in ascending order.

The Entrada has been dated to the early to middle Callovian stage of the latest Middle Jurassic.

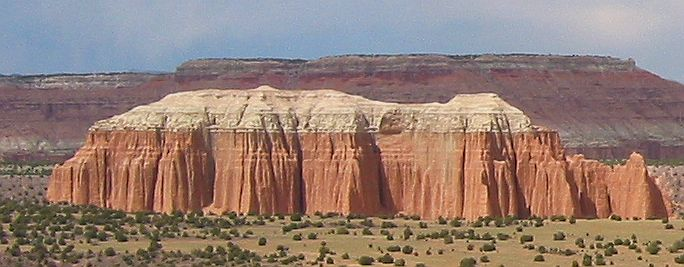
Entrada Sandstone overlain by Curtis Formation in Capitol Reef National Park's Cathedral Valley

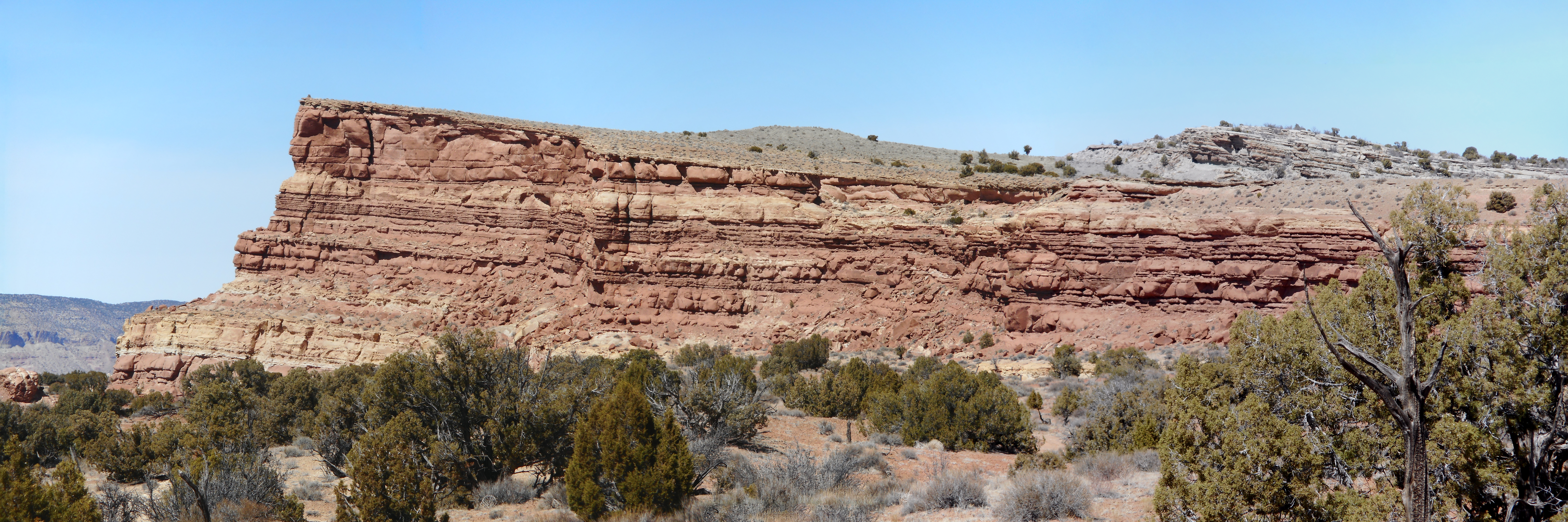
Entrada Formation at Curtis Point, Emery County, Utah.

== History of investigation ==
The Entrada Sandstone was named as one of the four formations of the San Rafael Group by James Gilluly and Reeside in 1928. Gregory and Moore worked out the geographic extent of the formation and gave an overview of it in 1931. The extent was revised several times afterwards (most recently in 1992 by Condon). It was divided into the Gunsight Butte, Cannonville, and Escalante members by Thompson and Stokes in 1970. The principal reference for the formation was written in 1988 by Peterson.

== Members ==
Entrada members are (in alphabetical order):

- Cannonville Member (UT)
- Cow Springs Member (AZ); equivalent to the upper member at the reference section in southern Utah
- Dewey Bridge Member (CO, UT) - named after the type locality at Dewey Bridge. This brick-red layer has a blocky look to it. Now assigned to the Carmel Formation.
- Escalante Member (UT)
- Henrieville Member (UT); abandoned by Peterson in 1988.
- Exeter Member (NM)
- Gunsight Butte Member (UT)
- Iyanbito Member (NM)
- Moab Member (CO, UT) or Moab Tongue (CO, UT) - named after the type locality of Moab, Utah. The whitish sands from inland dunes make up this "cap rock" layer, as seen atop Delicate Arch and Broken Arch in Arches National Park.
- Red Mesa Member (AZ, NM, UT)
- Slick Rock Member (CO, UT) - named for the type locality at Slick Rock, Colorado; rounded beach sands were cemented together to create this uniform layer.

== Places found ==
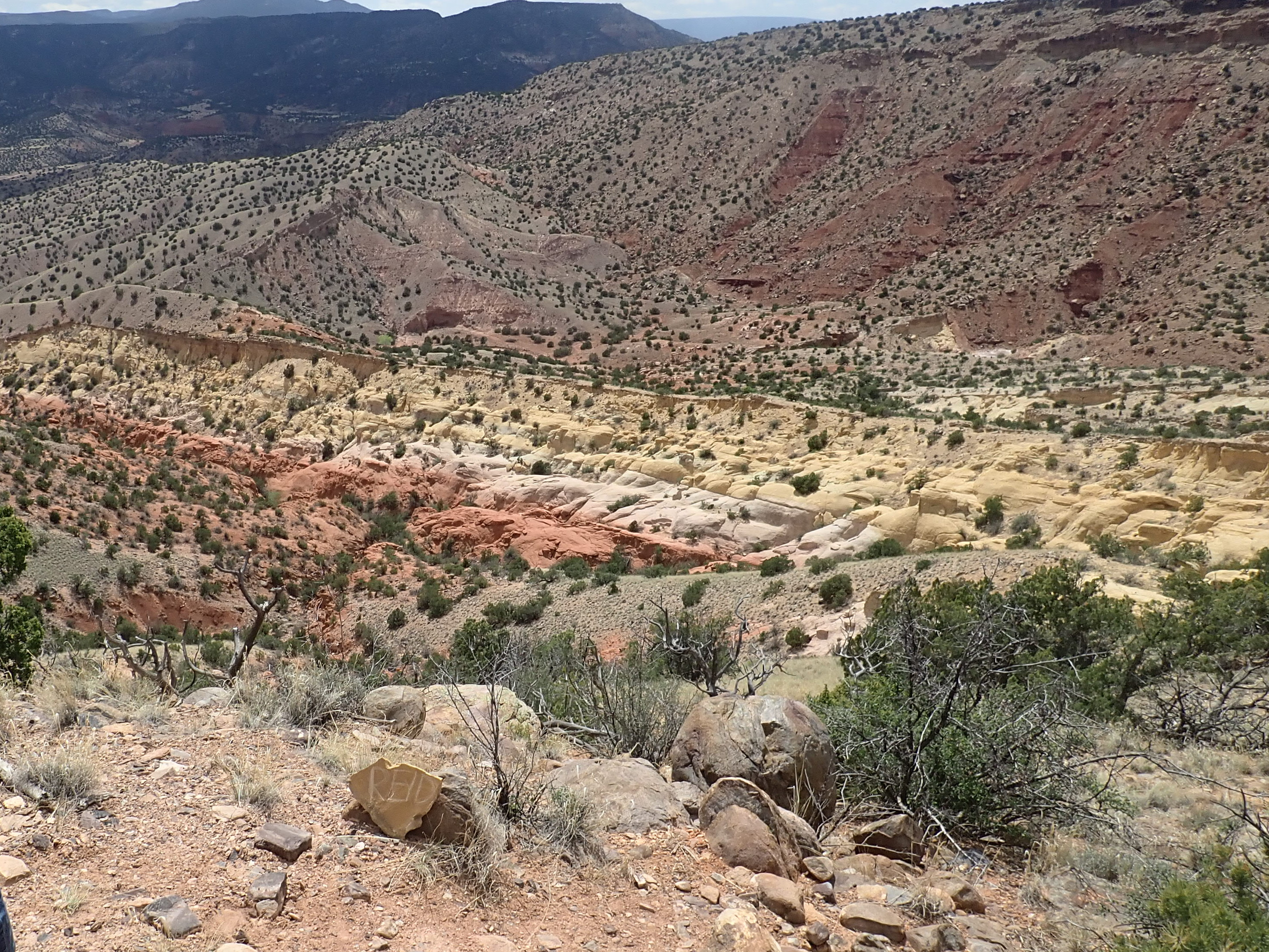
Entrada Sandstone at Red Wash Canyon, near Abiquiu, New Mexico

Entrada Sandstone is found in these geologic locations:

Geologic province:

- Anadarko Basin
- Black Mesa Basin
- Great Basin province
- Green River Basin
- Las Vegas-Raton Basin
- North Park Basin
- Paradox Basin
- Piceance Basin
- Plateau Sedimentary Province
- San Juan Basin
- Sierra Grande Uplift

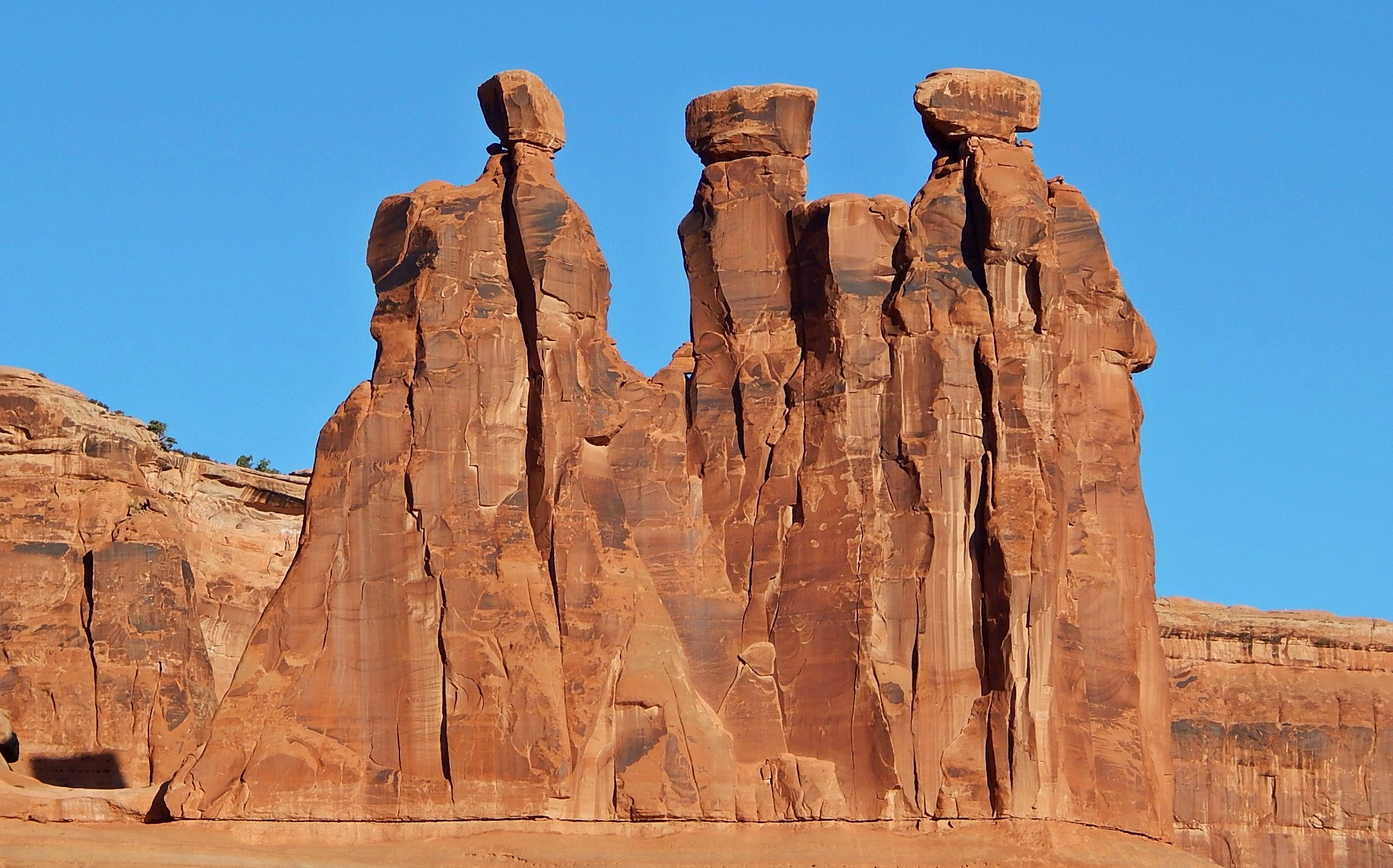
The Three Gossips in Arches National Park

Found in these parklands (incomplete list):

- Arches National Park
- Capitol Reef National Park
- Goblin Valley State Park
- Kodachrome Basin State Park

Spatial distribution:

- spatial distribution of Entrada Sandstone in Macrostrat
