= Todilto Formation =

Geologic formation in New Mexico

- Stratigraphic range: Callovian
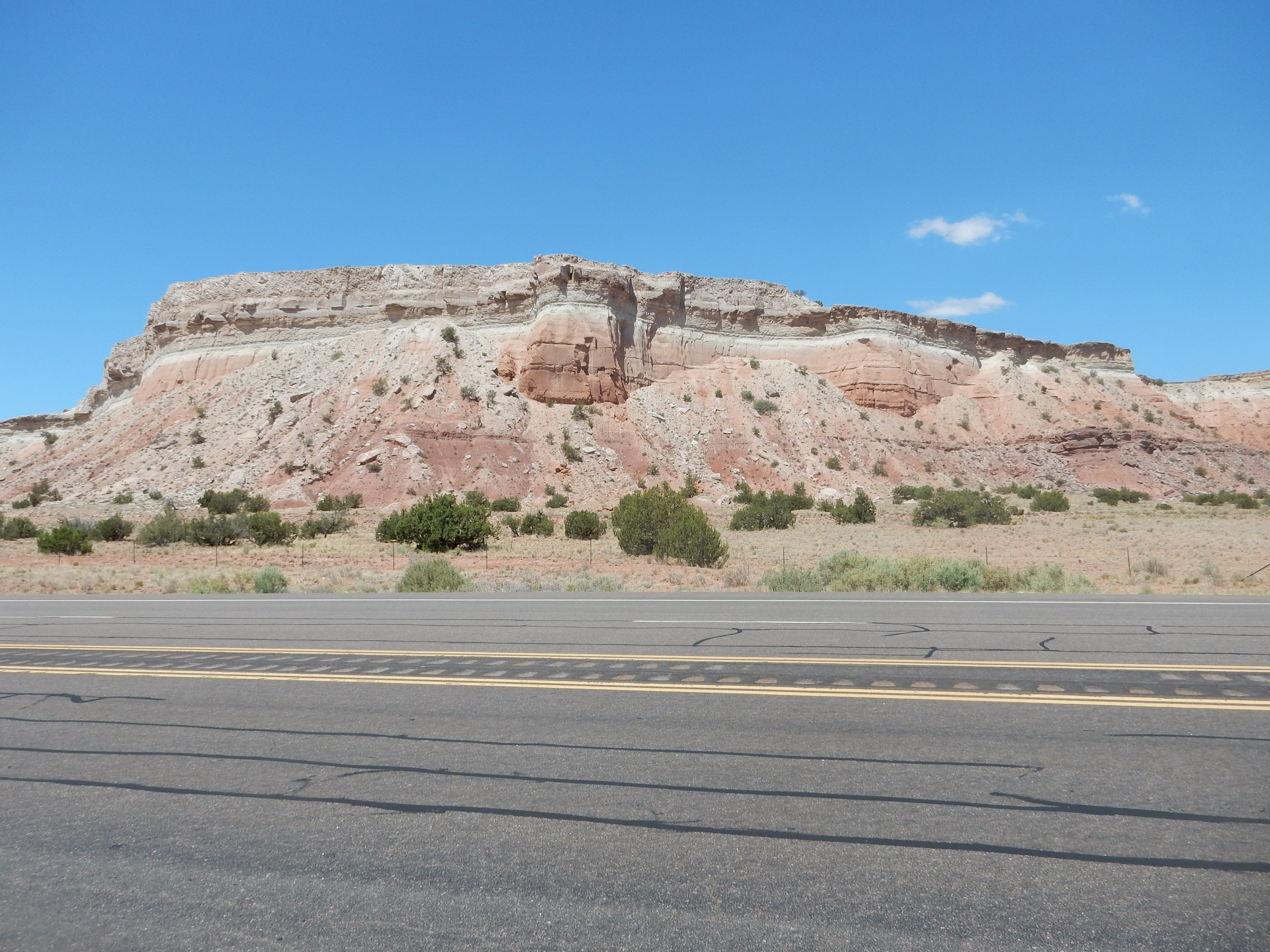
- Small hill capped with gypsum beds of the Todilto Formation
- Type: Formation
- Sub-units: Luciano Mesa Member, Tonque Arroyo Member
- Underlies: Beclabito Formation
- Overlies: Entrada Formation
- Thickness: 70 m (230 ft)

Lithology
- Primary: Gypsum
- Other: Calcareous shale

Location
- Coordinates: 35.911°N 108.956°W
- Region: New Mexico
- Country: United States

Type section
- Named for: Todilto Park, San Juan Basin
- Named by: Herbert E. Gregory
- Todilto Formation (the United States) Todilto Formation (New Mexico)

The Todilto Formation is a geologic formation in northern New Mexico and southeastern Colorado. It preserves fossils dating back to the Callovian stage of the middle Jurassic period.

== Description ==
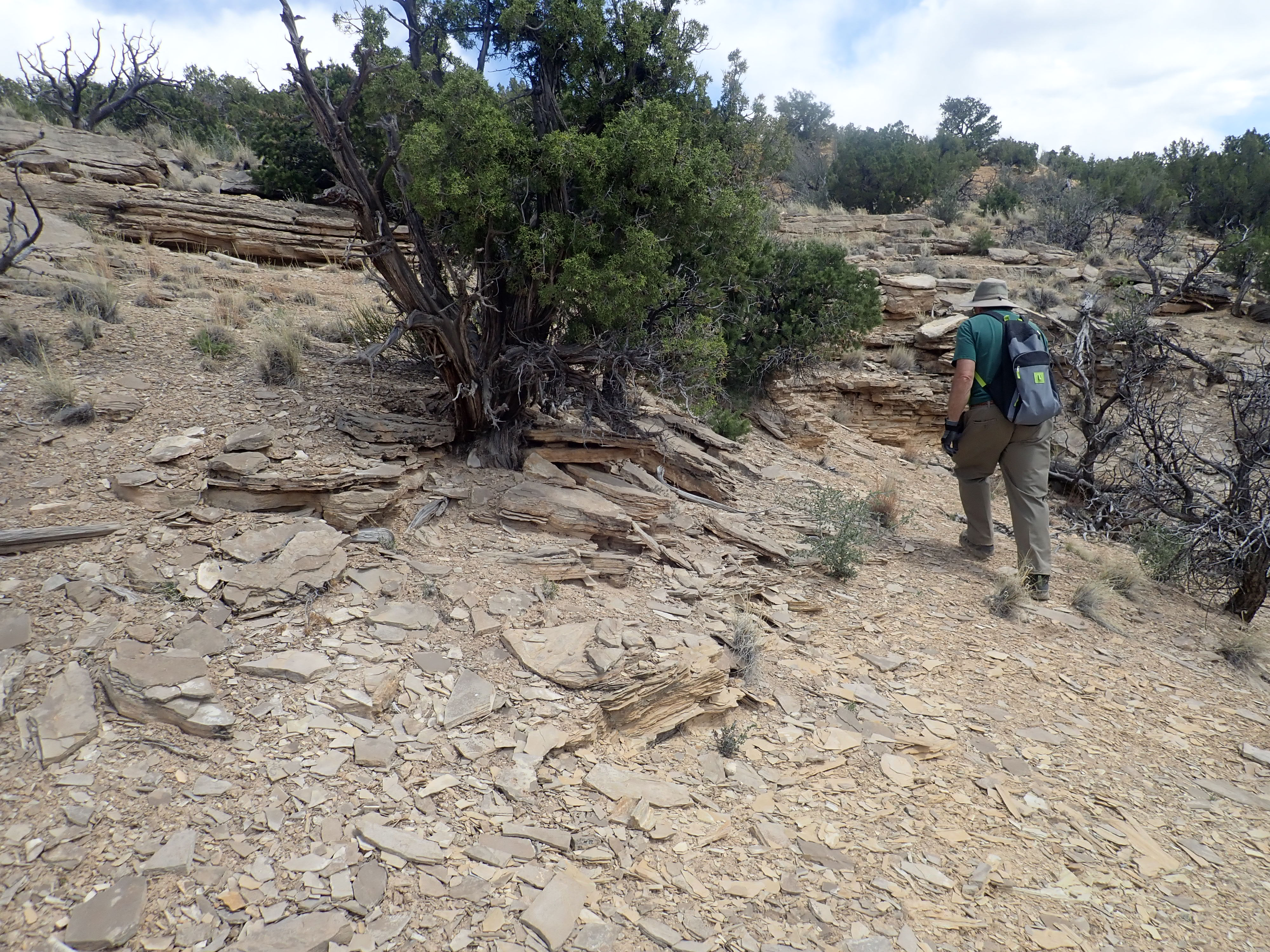
Luciano Mesa Member near Abiquiu, New Mexico

The formation consists of evaporites. It is divided into a lower calcareous shale (the Luciano Mesa Member) up to 6 meters (20 feet) thick, and an upper gypsum bed (the Tonque Arroyo Member).

Based on varve counts in the Luciano Mesa Member, the formation was laid down in a geologically brief period of time, likely in a salina (a coastal body of saline water) that was replenished both by rivers and by seepage or periodic flooding from the Sundance Sea. The varves show a 10 to 13 year periodicity that is interpreted as the solar sunspot cycle, showing that this cycle has existed for at least 160 million years. The contact with the underlying Entrada Formation is very sharp and may indicate the Todilto Sea formed catastrophically from a breach in a barrier between the basin and the Sundance Sea. The presence of dasyclad algae in the Luciano Mesa Member indicates at least some marine flooding.

== Fossils ==
Dasyclad algae have been found in the Luciano Mesa Member. Evidence has been found for stromatolites in the formation near Mesa Montañosa 35.3806°N 107.8763°W.

== Economic resources ==
The formation is mined for gypsum in the northern Albuquerque Basin, including along the La Bajada escarpment south of I-25, near San Felipe Pueblo, and at White Mesa near San Ysidro. It has also yielded uranium ore.

== History of investigation ==
The formation was first described by H.E. Gregory in 1917 for exposures at Todilto Park in the San Juan Basin. He assigned it to his (now defunct) La Plata Group. It has sometimes been included in the Morrison Formation.

== See also ==
- List of fossiliferous stratigraphic units in New Mexico
- Paleontology in New Mexico
