= Curtis Formation =

Geologic formation in Utah

- Stratigraphic range: Callovian
- Curtis Formation type
- Type: Formation
- Unit of: San Rafael Group
- Underlies: Summerville Formation
- Overlies: Entrada Sandstone

Lithology
- Primary: Sandstone
- Other: Mudstone, limestone

Location
- Coordinates: 39.126665°N 110.447615°W
- Region: Utah
- Country: United States

Type section
- Named for: Curtis Point, Emery County, Utah
- Named by: Gilluly and Reeside
- Year defined: 1928

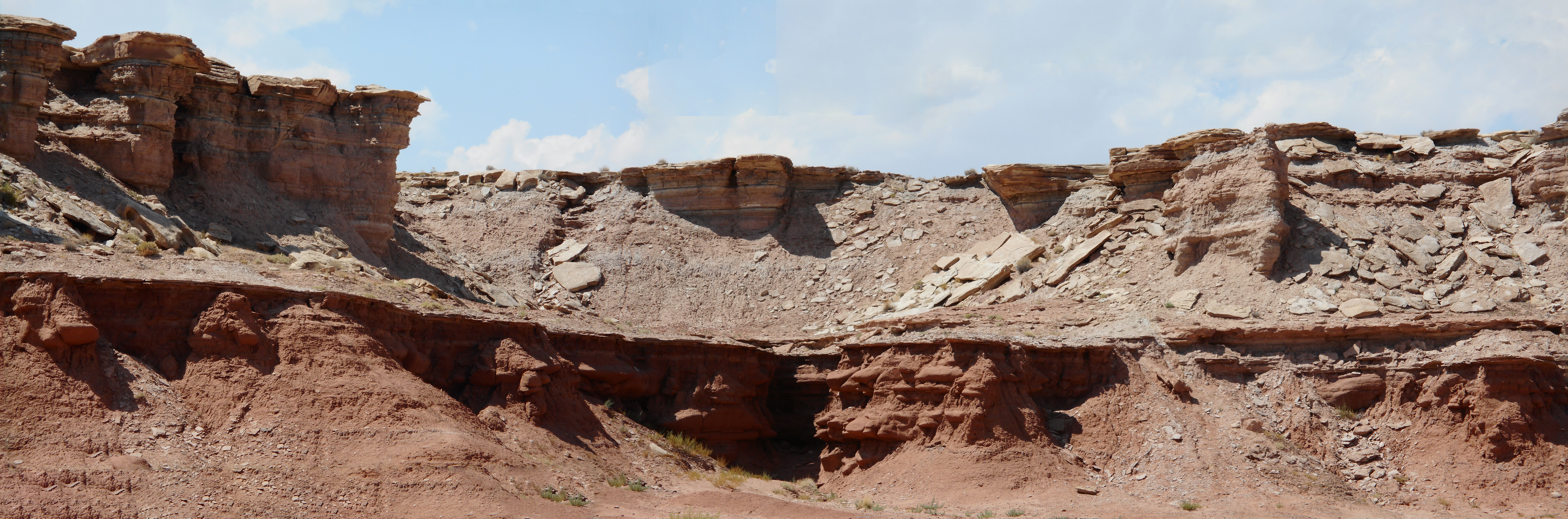
Light-colored beds of the Curtis Formation in abrupt contact with the underlying Entrada Formation. This contact marks the J3 unconformity,

The Curtis Formation is a geologic formation in Utah. It preserves fossils dating back to the Callovian age of the Jurassic period.

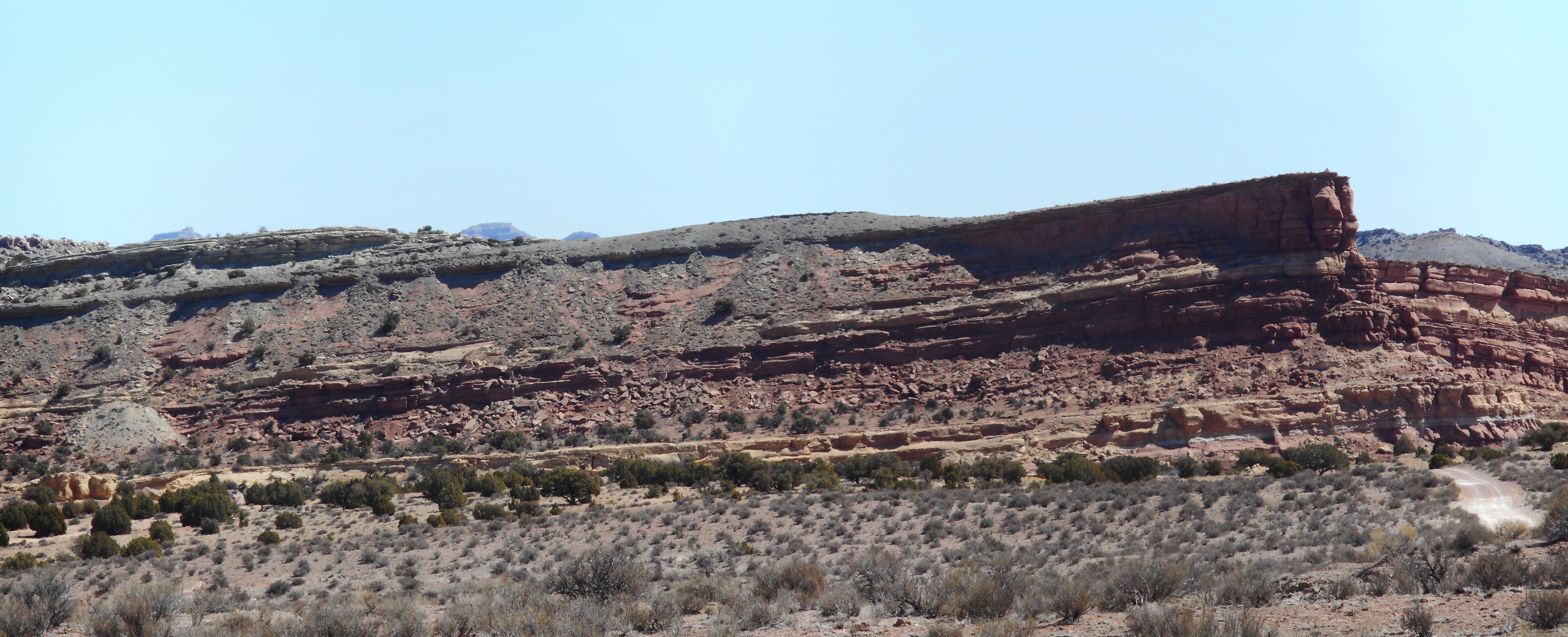
Curtis Point, namesake for the Curtis Formation visible as the light gray strata.

== Description ==
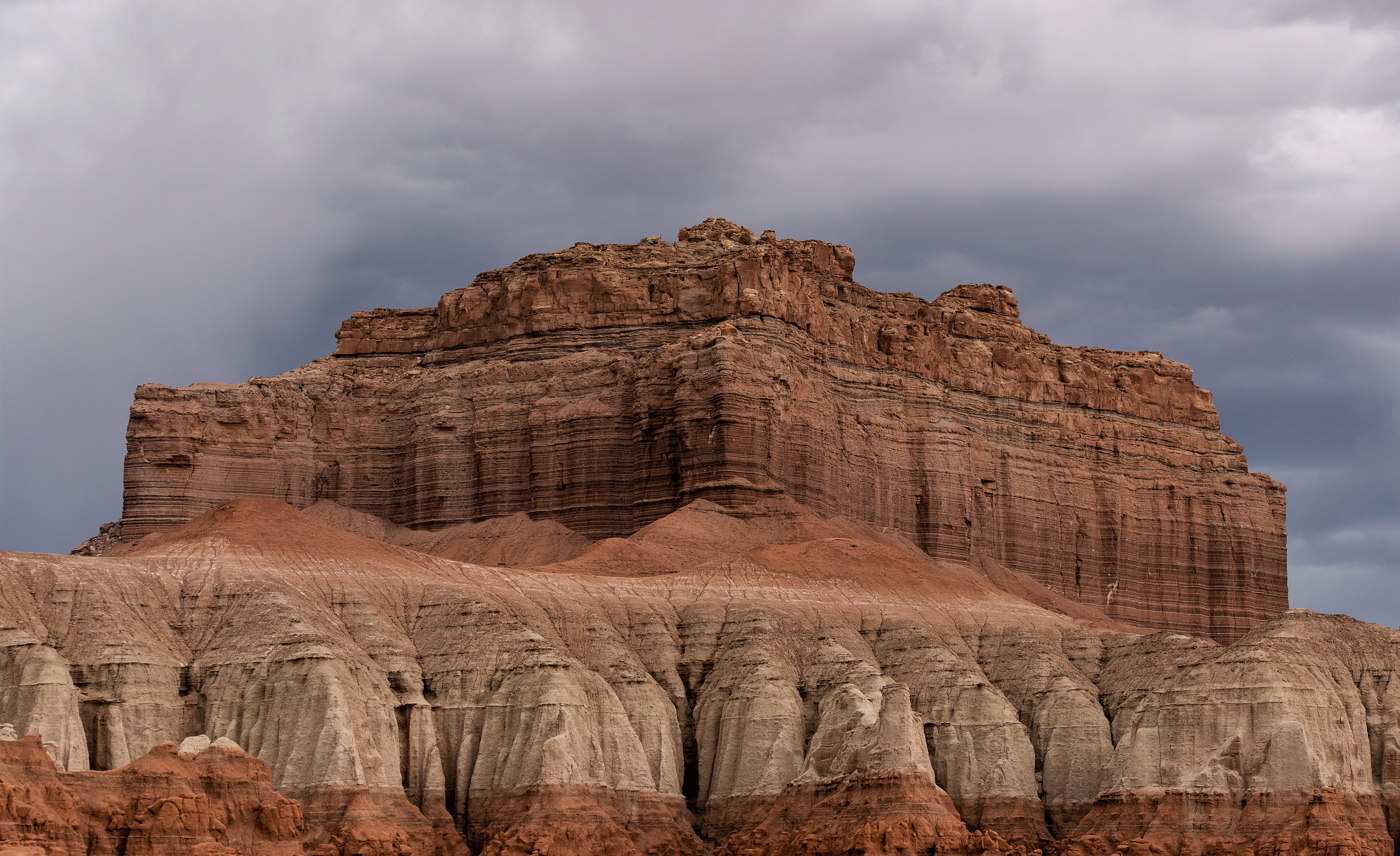
Lightly-colored Curtis Formation at Wild Horse Butte

The Curtis Formation is composed of shallow marine sandstone, with thin beds of mudstone and minor limestone and gypsum. The sandstone is grayish-green in color and flat bedded or cross bedded. The presence of glauconite and marine invertebrate fossils indicates it was laid down in a shallow marine environment that became hypersaline towards the end of deposition. It represents a high stand of the Sundance Sea in the Callovian.

== History of investigation ==
The formation was first described by Gilluly and Reeside in 1928 and named for exposures in the northeast San Rafael Reef at Curtis Point (39.126665°N 110.447615°W). Pipiringos and Imlay reassigned the Curtis as a member of the Stump Formation in 1979, but this was rejected by Peterson in 1988.

== See also ==
- List of fossiliferous stratigraphic units in Utah
- Paleontology in Utah
