= Bluff Formation =

Geologic formation in the western United States

- Stratigraphic range: late Jurassic
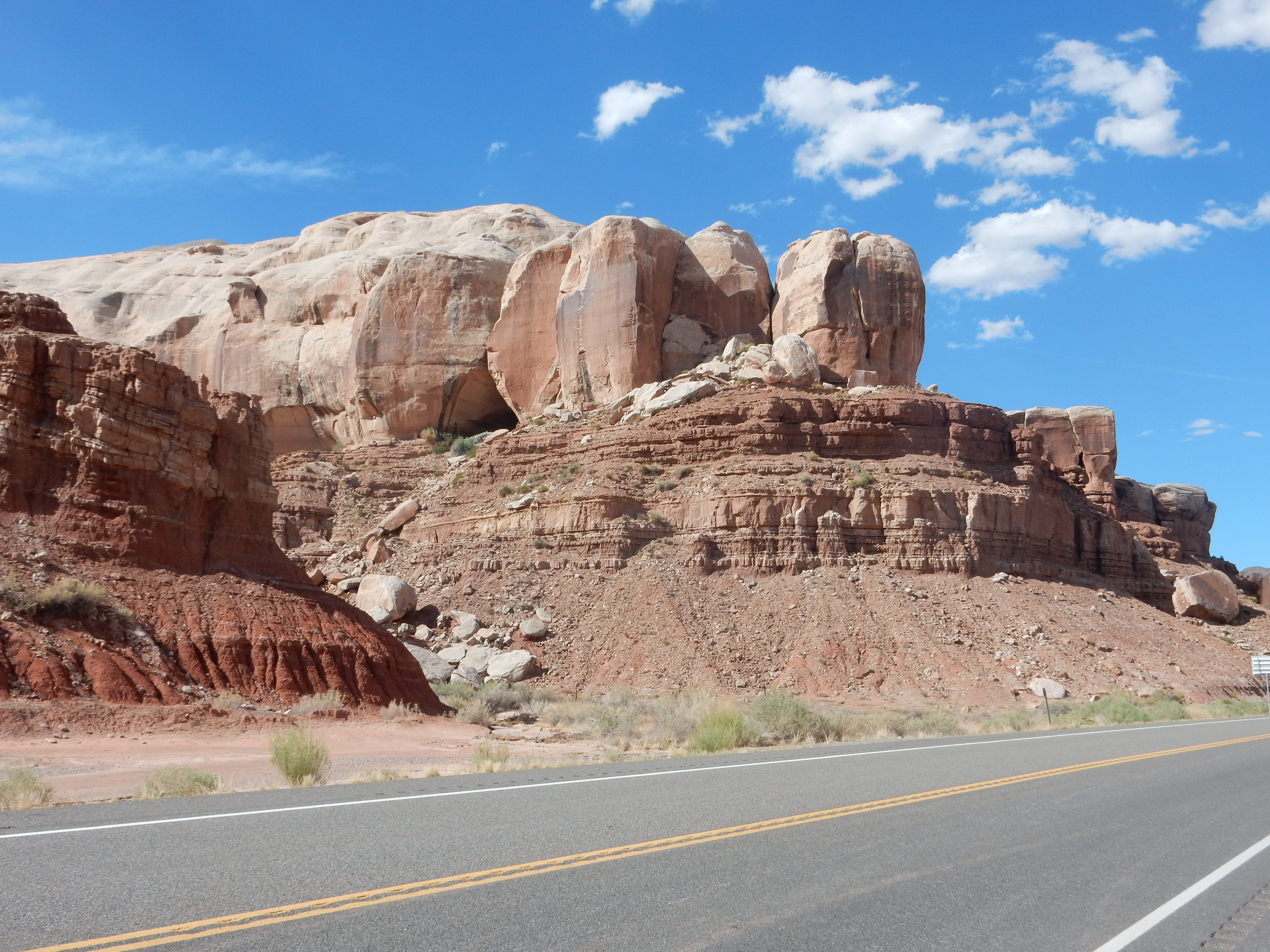
- Bluff Formation at its type area, Bluff, Utah, US
- Type: Formation
- Unit of: San Rafael Group
- Underlies: Morrison Formation
- Overlies: Summerville Formation
- Thickness: 350 ft (110 m)

Lithology
- Primary: Sandstone
- Other: Mudstone

Location
- Coordinates: 37.2893°N 109.5518°W
- Region: Four Corners
- Country: United States

Type section
- Named for: Bluff, Utah
- Named by: Baker, Dane, and Reeside
- Year defined: 1936
- Bluff Formation (the United States) Bluff Formation (Utah)

The Bluff Formation is a geological formation found in the Four Corners area. It was deposited in the late Jurassic Period.

== Description ==
The Bluff Formation consists of massive wind-deposited (eolian) sandstone beds at its type location at Bluff, Utah. These cap the cliffs north of town and are 100–350 feet (30–107 m) thick. Further to the southeast, the sandstone beds lack high-angle cross beds, being dominated instead by horizontal bed forms, and are overlain by mixed sandstone and shale beds of the Recapture Member. The Recapture Member has been variously assigned either to the overlying Morrison Formation or to the Bluff Formation. The Recapture Member is separated from the Salt Wash Member of the Morrison Formation by the regional J-5 unconformity.

== History of investigation ==
The formation was first named as the Bluff Sandstone by A.A. Baker, C.H. Dane, and J.B. Reeside, Jr., in 1938. They assigned it to the lower Morrison Formation. J.W. Harshbarger, Charles Repenning, and J.H. Irwin promoted it to formation rank in 1957, but this was not universally accepted. Spencer G. Lucas advocated both for formation rank and for assigning the Recapture Member to the Bluff Sandstone. Steven M. Cather agreed with promotion of the Bluff Sandstone to formation rank but advocated leaving the Recapture Member with the Morrison Formation.
