= Mollys Castle =

Butte in Emery County, Utah, United States

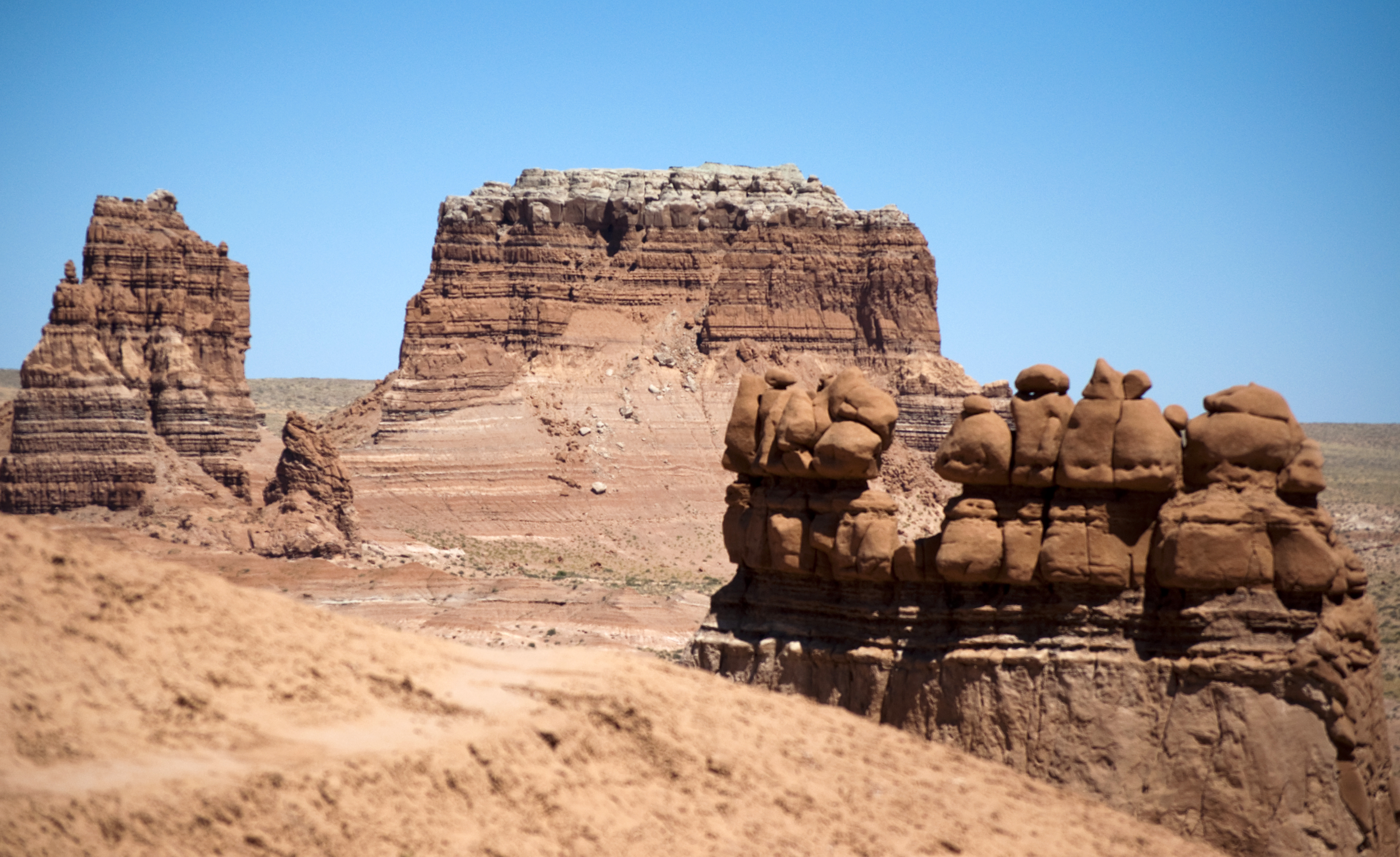
- Mollys Castle

Highest point
- Elevation: 5,265 ft (1,605 m)
- Prominence: 365 ft (111 m)
- Parent peak: Wild Horse Butte (5,760 ft)
- Isolation: 2.08 mi (3.35 km)
- Coordinates: 38°34′36″N 110°40′51″W

Geography
- Location within Utah Location within the United States
- Location: Emery County, Utah, U.S.
- Parent range: Colorado Plateau
- Topo map: USGS Goblin Valley

Geology
- Rock age: Jurassic
- Rock type: sandstone

Mollys Castle is a remote 5,265-foot (1,605 m) elevation summit located near Goblin Valley State Park, in Emery County, Utah, United States, on the western edge of the Well Draw valley.

== Description ==
Mollys Castle is situated 2.3 mi (3.7 km) east of Wild Horse Butte, and one-half mile (0.80 km) outside the park's east boundary. The top of this magnificent butte rises 265 feet above its surrounding terrain. Precipitation runoff from Mollys Castle enters the Colorado River drainage basin.

== Geology ==
Mollys Castle is a geological feature set within the San Rafael Desert on the southeastern edge of the San Rafael Swell. This erosional remnant is composed of Jurassic rock. The thin, light-colored layer on top is Curtis Formation caprock, overlaying darker, reddish Entrada Sandstone, which is also the composition of the hoodoos that give Goblin Valley its name.

== Climate ==
Spring and fall are the most favorable seasons to visit Mollys Castle. According to the Köppen climate classification system, it is located in a Cold semi-arid climate zone, which is defined by the coldest month having an average mean temperature below −0 °C (32 °F) and at least 50% of the total annual precipitation being received during the spring and summer. This desert climate receives less than 10 inches (250 millimetres) of annual rainfall, and snowfall is generally light during the winter.

== See also ==
- List of mountains in Utah
- Colorado Plateau
