= Galaxy Quest =

1999 film by Dean Parisot

- Theatrical release poster
- Directed by: Dean Parisot
- Screenplay by: David Howard; Robert Gordon
- Story by: David Howard
- Produced by: Mark Johnson; Charles Newirth
- Starring: Tim Allen; Sigourney Weaver; Alan Rickman; Tony Shalhoub; Sam Rockwell; Daryl Mitchell
- Cinematography: Jerzy Zieliński
- Edited by: Don Zimmerman
- Music by: David Newman
- Production company: Gran Via Productions
- Distributed by: DreamWorks Pictures
- Release date: December 25, 1999
- Running time: 102 minutes
- Country: United States
- Language: English
- Budget: $45 million
- Box office: $90.7 million

Galaxy Quest is a 1999 American satirical science fiction comedy film directed by Dean Parisot and written by David Howard and Robert Gordon. It stars Tim Allen, Sigourney Weaver, Alan Rickman, Tony Shalhoub, Sam Rockwell, and Daryl Mitchell. It follows the cast of a fictional cult television series, Galaxy Quest, as they are drawn into a real interstellar conflict by aliens, who think the series is a documentary and have shaped their society around the show. The film parodies and pays homage to science-fiction films and series, especially Star Trek and its fandom.

Galaxy Quest was released by DreamWorks Pictures on December 25, 1999. The film grossed $90.7 million against a $45 million budget and received positive reviews. It won the Hugo Award for Best Dramatic Presentation and the Nebula Award for Best Script, and was nominated for ten Saturn Awards, including Best Science Fiction Film and Best Director, Best Actress for Weaver, and Best Supporting Actor for Rickman; Allen won Best Actor.

Galaxy Quest achieved cult status, especially from Star Trek fans for its affectionate parody. Several Star Trek cast and crew members praised the film. It was included in Reader's Digest's list of the Top 100+ Funniest Movies of All Time in 2012, and Star Trek fans voted it the seventh-best Star Trek film in 2013.

== Plot ==
The cast of the 1980s space-adventure series Galaxy Quest attend fan conventions and make trivial promotional appearances. Though the series' vain former star, Jason Nesmith, thrives on the attention, his co-stars Gwen DeMarco, Alexander Dane, Fred Kwan, and Tommy Webber resent him and their stalled careers. At a convention, a group calling themselves Thermians led by Mathesar approaches Jason for help. Thinking they want him for a promotional appearance, he agrees. Jason also overhears two attendees mocking him and the fans. Despondent, he brusquely dismisses other fans, including Brandon, before going home to drink and watch reruns of the series.

The next morning, when the Thermians pick him up, a hungover Jason does not grasp that they are actual aliens who have transported him to a working re-creation of the Galaxy Quest starship, the NSEA Protector. Jason believes he is on a set, and performs in character as he confronts the Thermians' enemy, Sarris, who demands the "Omega 13", a secret super weapon with unknown capabilities mentioned but never used in the show's cliffhanger. Giving perfunctory orders, Jason fires on and temporarily defeats Sarris.

After the grateful Thermians transport him back to Earth, Jason realizes the experience was real and attempts to convince the other cast members. In his excitement, Jason bumps into Brandon again, accidentally swapping Brandon's toy communicator with a real one Jason acquired from the Thermians. When one of the Thermians, Laliari, seeks Jason's help again, the cast joins him, along with the convention emcee, Guy, who had played an ill-fated extra in one episode. Aboard the Protector, the cast learn that the Thermians, who possess no concept of fiction, believe the episodes of Galaxy Quest are true "historical documents". Inspired by the crew's adventures, they have based their society on the virtues espoused by the show.

Sarris returns and demands the Omega 13 device. He attacks the Protector again, and the ship barely escapes through a magnetic minefield. However, the ship's power source, a beryllium sphere, is severely damaged. The humans travel to a nearby planet and take a replacement sphere from ferocious, childlike alien miners. Jason is temporarily left behind and fends off a rock creature until Fred beams him up. Back on the Protector, the crew discovers that Sarris has seized the ship. After Jason confesses they are just actors, Sarris forces him to explain the truth to Mathesar. Sarris has the Protector's core hard-wired to overload and returns to his ship.

Jason and Gwen contact Brandon via the swapped communicator, and Brandon and his superfan friends guide them to abort the core implosion sequence. Brandon also explains that the Omega 13 is either a universe-destroying bomb or a "matter re-arranger" that sends the user 13 seconds back in time. Meanwhile, Alexander leads a Thermian revolt against Sarris' forces and takes back control of the Protector. The crew challenges Sarris and draws his ship into the magnetic minefield, destroying it. As they return to Earth, Sarris, who narrowly escaped his ship's destruction, ambushes them on the bridge and fatally wounds several crew members. Jason activates the Omega 13, which sends everyone 13 seconds back in time, allowing Jason and Mathesar to thwart Sarris before he attacks.

The Protector's bridge separates from the main vessel to return the humans to Earth, while the main vessel carries the Thermians into interstellar space. The Protector bridge crashes into the Galaxy Quest convention, and the dazed cast emerges to the cheers of their fans. Sarris awakens and levels his gun at the cast, but Jason shoots and destroys him. The crowd assumes it was all a display of special effects and cheers wildly. Jason, with newfound humility, invites his co-stars to share the stage with him and the crew basks in their newfound glory.

Sometime later, Galaxy Quest is revived as a sequel series, Galaxy Quest: The Journey Continues, with the cast reprising their roles alongside Guy and Laliari as new cast members.

== Cast ==
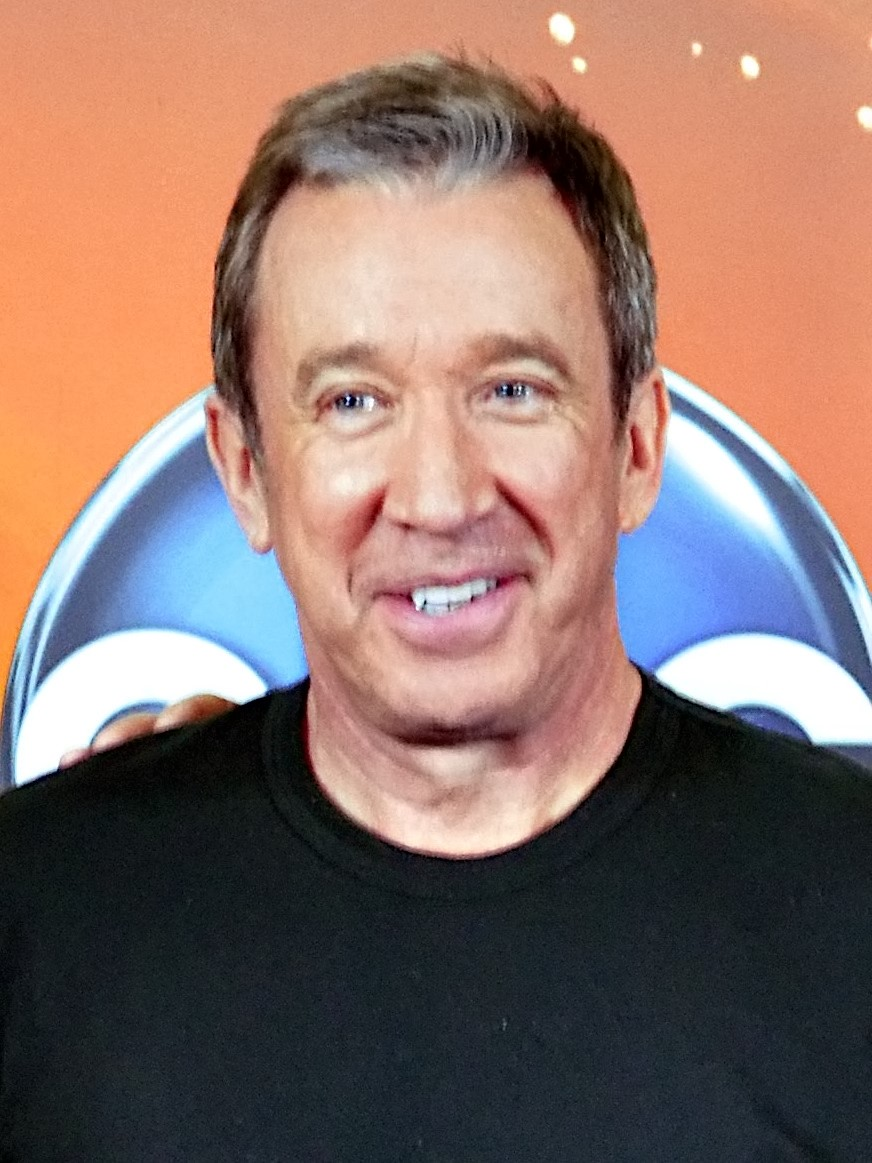
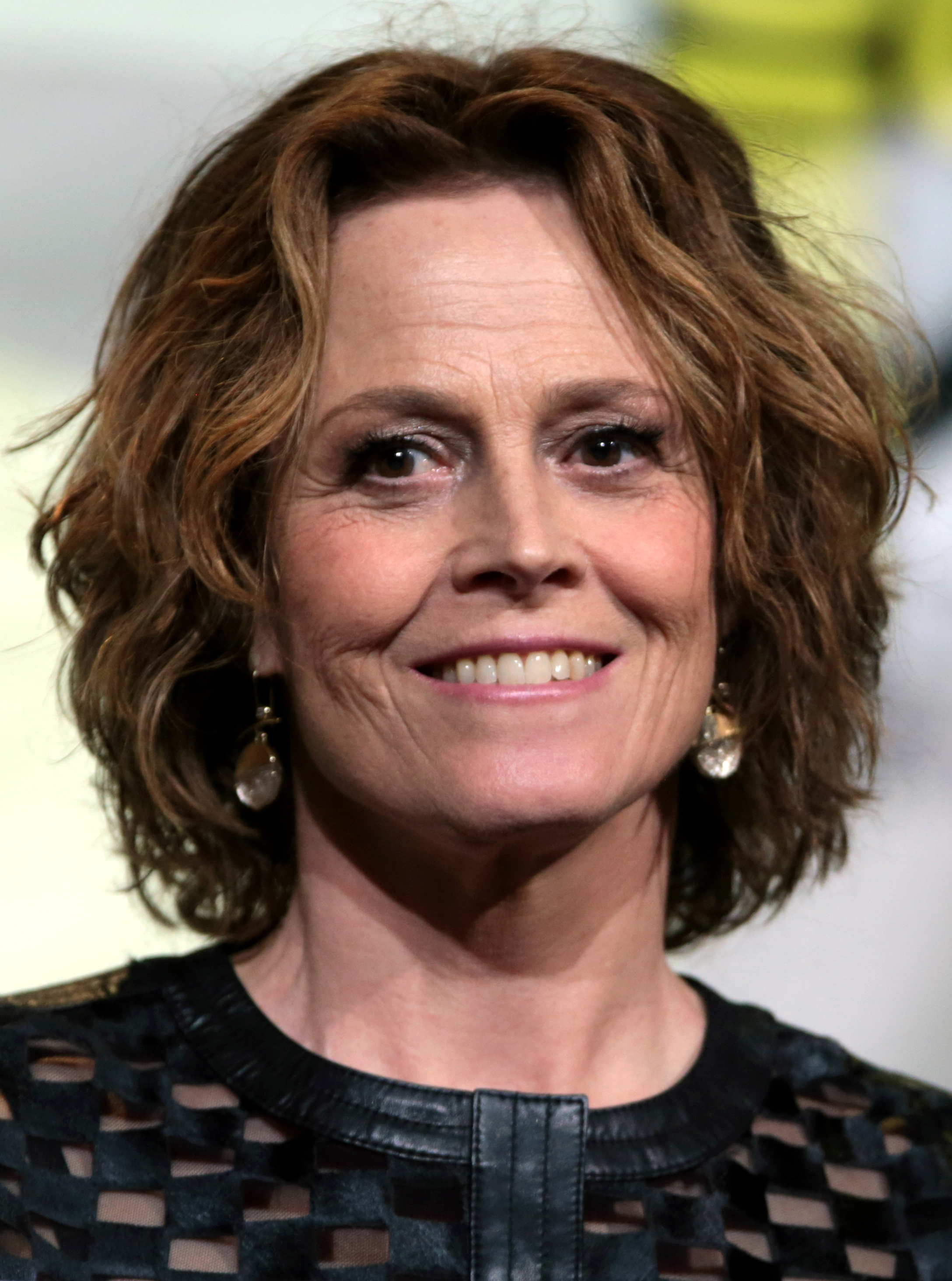
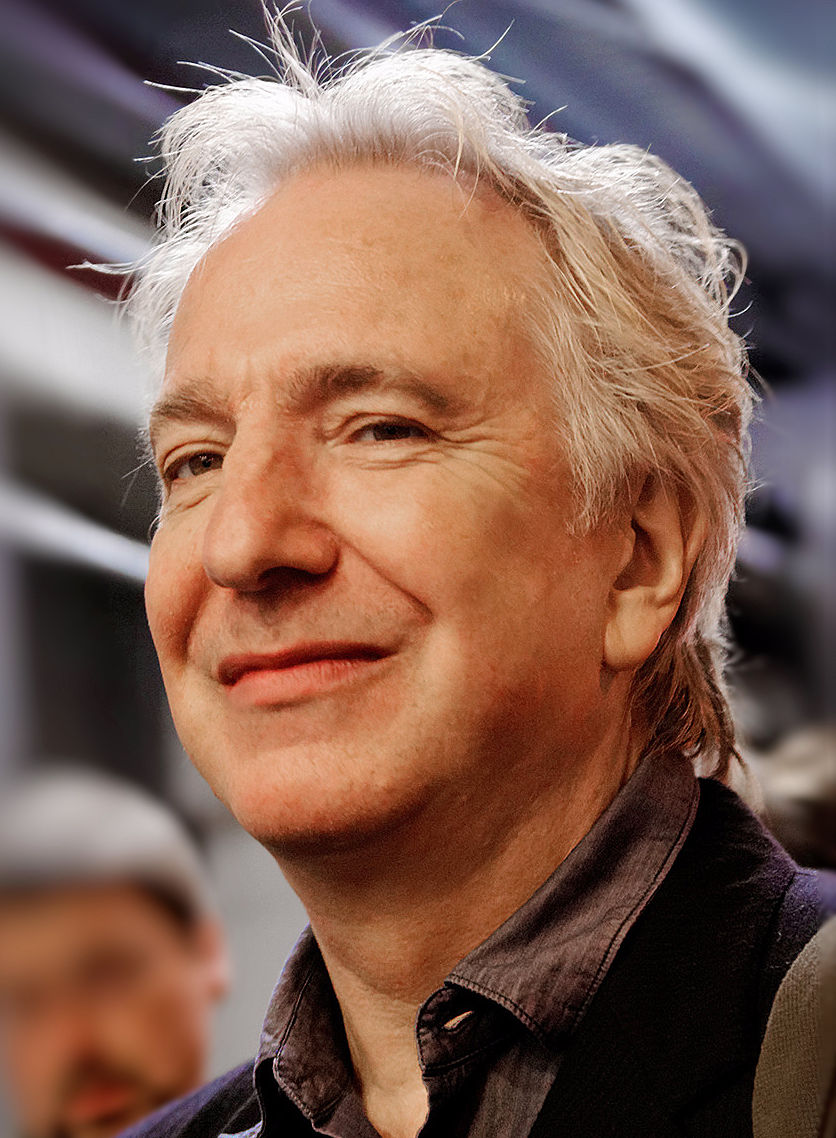
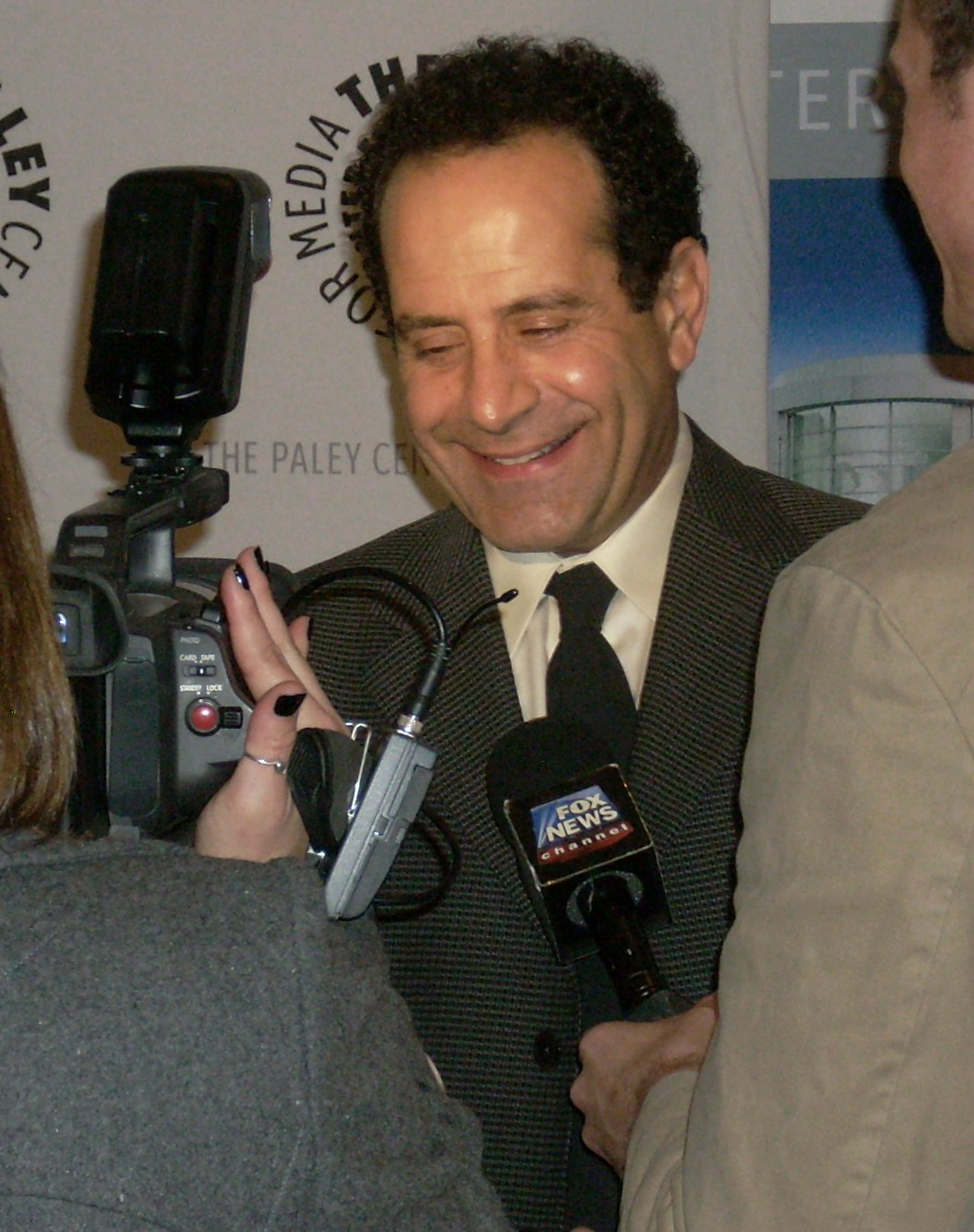
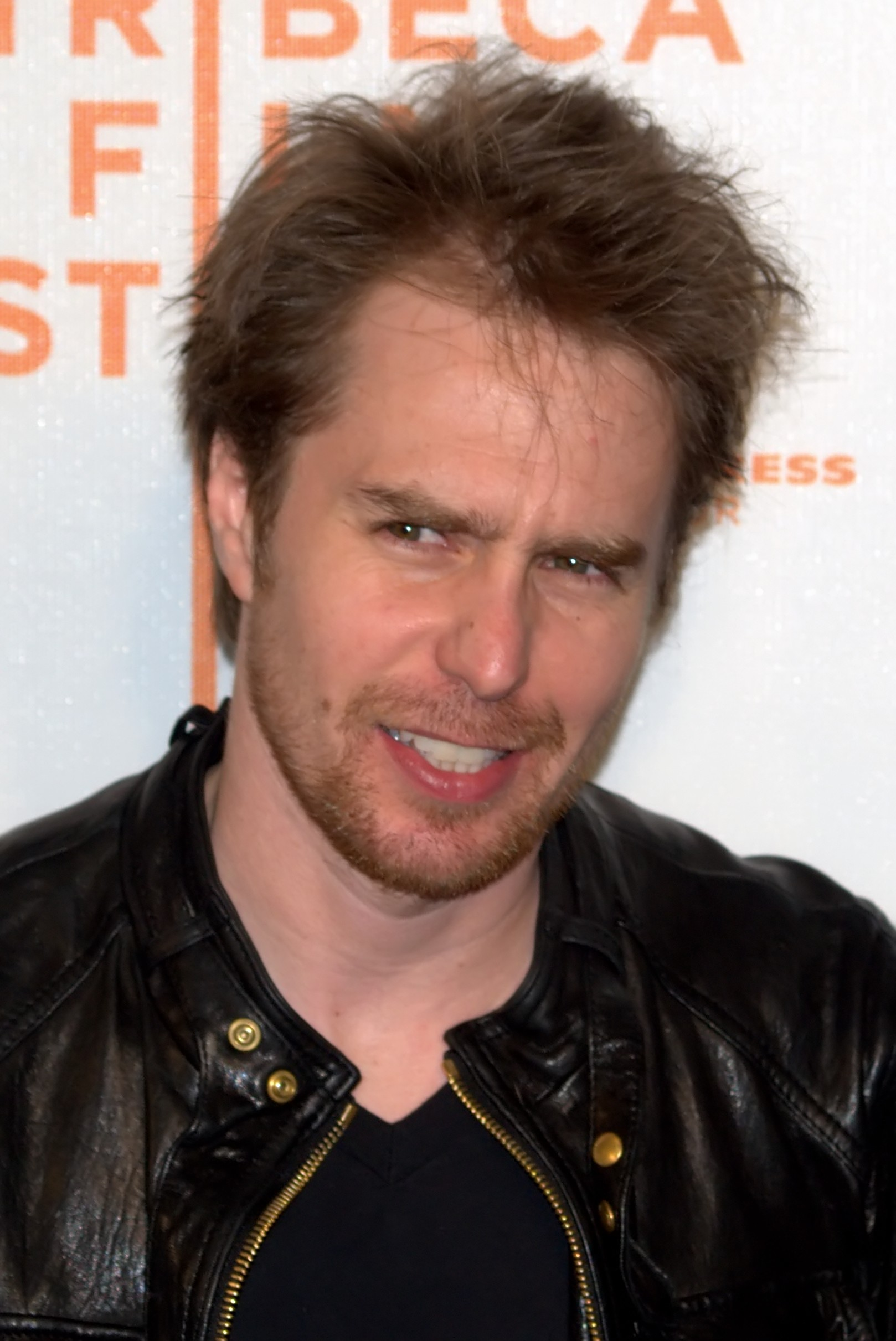
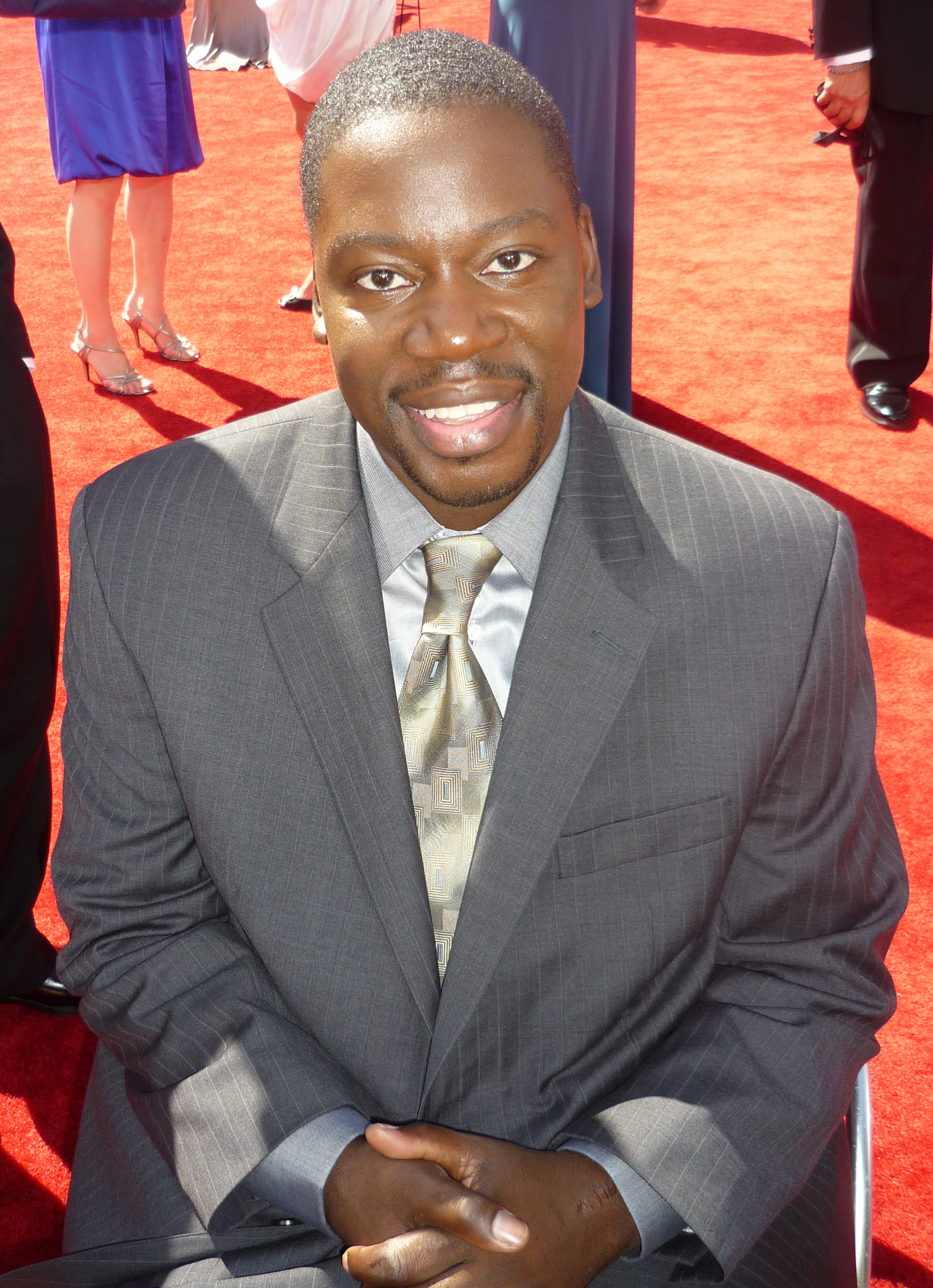
The actors playing the original Protector crew on Galaxy Quest, from left to right: (top) Tim Allen, Sigourney Weaver, Alan Rickman, (bottom) Tony Shalhoub, Sam Rockwell, and Daryl Mitchell
- Tim Allen as Jason Nesmith, who played Commander Peter Quincy Taggart, the commander of the NSEA Protector and main character of the series.
- Sigourney Weaver as Gwen DeMarco, who played Lieutenant Tawny Madison, the ship's communications officer and the only officer aboard who can give orders to the ship's computer.
- Alan Rickman as Alexander Dane, a Shakespearean actor who played Dr. Lazarus, the ship's science officer and a member of the Mak'tar, an alien species known for their superhuman intelligence and psionic powers.
- Tony Shalhoub as Fred Kwan, who played Tech Sergeant Chen, the ship's chief engineer. He enters a relationship with Laliari.
- Sam Rockwell as Guy Fleegman, the cast's handler at conventions who also played "Crewman #6", a short-lived minor character, in a single episode. In the revival, he plays Security Chief "Roc" Ingersol.
- Daryl Mitchell as Tommy Webber, who played Lieutenant Laredo, a child pilot.
  - Corbin Bleu as a younger Laredo during the original TV series.
- Enrico Colantoni as Mathesar, the leader of the Thermians who have a true octopus-like appearance.
- Robin Sachs as Roth'h'ar Sarris, the general of a group of reptilian humanoids who seek to destroy the Thermians.
- Patrick Breen as Quellek, a Thermian who forms a bond with Alexander Dane.
- Missi Pyle as Laliari, a Thermian and love interest for Fred. In the revival at the end of the film, under the name of Jane Doe she plays Laliari, a fictionalized version of herself.
- Jed Rees as Teb, a Thermian and Mathesar's second-in-command.
- Justin Long as Brandon, a fan of Galaxy Quest.
- Jeremy Howard as Kyle, Brandon's friend
- Kaitlin Cullum as Katelyn, Brandon's friend
- Jonathan Feyer as Hollister, Brandon's friend
- Heidi Swedberg as Brandon's mom
- Wayne Péré as Lt. Lathe, Sarris's second-in-command
- Samuel Lloyd as Neru, a Thermian
- Rainn Wilson as Lahnk, a Thermian
- Kevin McDonald (as Kevin Hamilton McDonald) as Announcer
- Joe Frank as the voice of the Protector computer

== Production ==
=== Development ===
The original spec script by David Howard was titled Captain Starshine. Howard stated he got the idea while at an IMAX presentation, where one of the trailers for an upcoming "Americans in Space" film was narrated by Leonard Nimoy, a leading actor from Star Trek. The trailer got Howard thinking about how the other Star Trek actors had become pigeonholed in these roles since the cancellation of Star Trek, and he then came up with the idea of "What if there were real aliens involved?" From there, he considered that the rest of his script, "in a lot of ways, just wrote itself, because it just seemed so self-evident once the idea was there".

Producer Mark Johnson, who had a first-look deal with DreamWorks, did not like Howard's script but was fascinated with its concept of space aliens who misconstrue old episodes of a television series as reality. Johnson purchased the script and had Bob Gordon use the concept to create Galaxy Quest. A fan of Star Trek, Gordon was hesitant, believing Galaxy Quest "could be a great idea or it could be a terrible idea" and initially turned it down. Gordon, who did not read Captain Starshine until after the film was completed, started from the premise of washed-up actors from a sci-fi series involved with real extraterrestrials. Gordon's initial drafts added elements of humor to Howard's script, such as the Protector scraping the walls of the space dock when Webber pilots the real ship for the first time. The scene with the "Chompers" leading into the Omega 13 came from Gordon's viewing of the horror film Event Horizon, which featured a rotating tunnel lined with sharp blades leading into the ship's engine room. Gordon became more confident when he completed the scene where Nesmith confesses to the Thermians, which he felt he nailed. He submitted his first draft to DreamWorks in 1998, and it was immediately green-lit.

Johnson wanted Dean Parisot to direct. Parisot had directed another film Johnson produced, Home Fries. However, DreamWorks favored Harold Ramis because of his experience and hired him in November 1998. Ramis wanted Alec Baldwin for the lead role, but Baldwin turned it down. Steve Martin and Kevin Kline were also considered, but Kline turned it down for family reasons. Ramis did not agree with the casting of Tim Allen as Jason Nesmith and left the project in February 1999. Parisot took over as director within three weeks. Allen said that the version of the film pitched to him by Ramis and Jeffrey Katzenberg felt more like Spaceballs, and that they wanted an action star to do comedy rather than a comedian to do an action film. Sigourney Weaver, who had worked with Ramis on Ghostbusters, said that he also wanted actors who had not appeared in science-fiction roles before, a choice she thought odd since veterans of the genre would know what was humorous. After seeing the film, Ramis said he was impressed with Allen's performance. Johnson named the main villain after film critic Andrew Sarris, while admitting he also considered "Haskell" after Molly Haskell, who was married to Sarris. Once Sarris discovered this, he mocked "This guy wants to insult me? Oh, boohoo. As long as they spelled my name right, I'm okay."

=== Casting ===
Following Parisot's assignment as director, Allen was quickly cast as Nesmith, and had to choose between Galaxy Quest and Bicentennial Man. The Bicentennial Man role went to Robin Williams. Allen said he was a big sci-fi fan and had hoped the role would launch a second part of his career as a sci-fi actor. Some of Allen's sci-fi knowledge was put to use during production: for example, when the crew is about to land on an alien planet, Allen brought up the issue of a breathable atmosphere with Johnson and Parisot; this became dialogue for Fleegman and Kwan in the movie. About his role, Allen said he based his performance more on Yul Brynner's Ramesses II from the 1956 The Ten Commandments, and less on William Shatner as Captain James Kirk from Star Trek.

Alan Rickman was selected to be Alexander Dane, who played the alien Dr. Lazarus. Rickman had been interested in the part not so much for the sci-fi elements, but because of the humor. He said "I love comedy almost more than anything. This really is one of the funniest scripts I've read," and that "actors are probably the only professionals who send themselves up. We actually have a sense of humor about ourselves." While the original script made Dane a ceremonial knight, Rickman suggested the title would be too much for the character, and this was dropped, though he remained listed as "Sir Alex Dane" in the credits. Rickman also provided input into the prosthetic piece that Dane would use to play Lazarus, saying "it was important for it to be good enough to convince the aliens who believe we're the real thing, but also cheesy enough to imagine that it was something he applied himself". Rickman's sense of drama came into play during initial reads and script revisions. Rockwell said that Rickman "was very instrumental in making sure the script hit the dramatic notes, and everything had a strong logic and reason behind it". The scene where Dane, as Dr. Lazarus, gives a final, powerfully emotional speech to Quellek, played by Patrick Breen, used Rickman's sense of drama, according to Rockwell. Dr. Lazarus' catchphrase, "By Grabthar's Hammer", was written as a temp line in Gordon's script; Gordon planned to replace "Grabthar" with something less comical, but the line stuck as the production crew started using it around their offices and had it printed on t-shirts.

Weaver had loved the script since her first read when Ramis was the director, stating "that great sort of Wizard of Oz story of these people feeling so incomplete in the beginning, and then during the course of this adventure, they come out almost like the heroes they pretended to be in the first place." She particularly loved the part of Madison: "to me she was what a lot of women feel like, including myself, in a Hollywood situation." In addition, she had long wanted to work with both Allen and Rickman. Once Parisot replaced Ramis, Weaver lobbied Parisot to cast her, insisting that Madison needed to be blonde and have large breasts to capture the humor of a sci-fi production. She was surprised when she got the role. Weaver said that this role, given some of her personal insecurities, was closer to "telling the truth about myself and science fiction" compared to her performance as Ripley in the Alien films. She wore a blonde wig (which she kept after production) and an enhanced bosom, which many of the crew said gave Weaver a new personality. Weaver often left the set in costume and returned to her hotel to admire herself, saying that she "loved being a starlet."

Tony Shalhoub originally auditioned for Guy Fleegman until Sam Rockwell was cast. Shalhoub was cast as Fred Kwan and worked with Parisot to develop the character. Kwan was loosely based on David Carradine, who was a non-Asian in an Asian role in the television series Kung Fu. Additionally, it was rumored that Carradine frequently acted while under the influence of drugs. Although Shalhoub could not overtly portray a "stoner" in a PG-13 film, he insisted that Kwan should always be shown eating to subtly reference the stoner stereotype.

Rockwell, who wanted to develop a more serious dramatic acting career, initially considered declining the role after he was cast. He eventually recognized that several successful dramatic actors had done comedy roles early on, and fellow actor Kevin Spacey persuaded him to take the part. He was the last of the main actors to be cast. Rockwell fashioned Fleegman after cowardly characters from other films, such as John Turturro's Bernie in Miller's Crossing, Bill Paxton's Private Hudson in Aliens, and Michael Keaton's "Blaze" in Night Shift. Rockwell drank a lot of coffee before certain scenes to help create the over-excitement and jitters associated with the character. Rockwell's character's name, Guy Fleegman, is a homage to Guy Vardaman, a little-known actor who worked extensively on Star Trek either as a stand-in or in bit roles. Rockwell and Shalhoub improvised some dialog to contrast Fleegman as an alarmist while Kwan was always nonchalant. Daryl Mitchell had worked with Parisot on Home Fries, and Parisot felt he was the perfect choice to play Webber. David Alan Grier was "head to head" with Mitchell for the part, according to Mitchell.

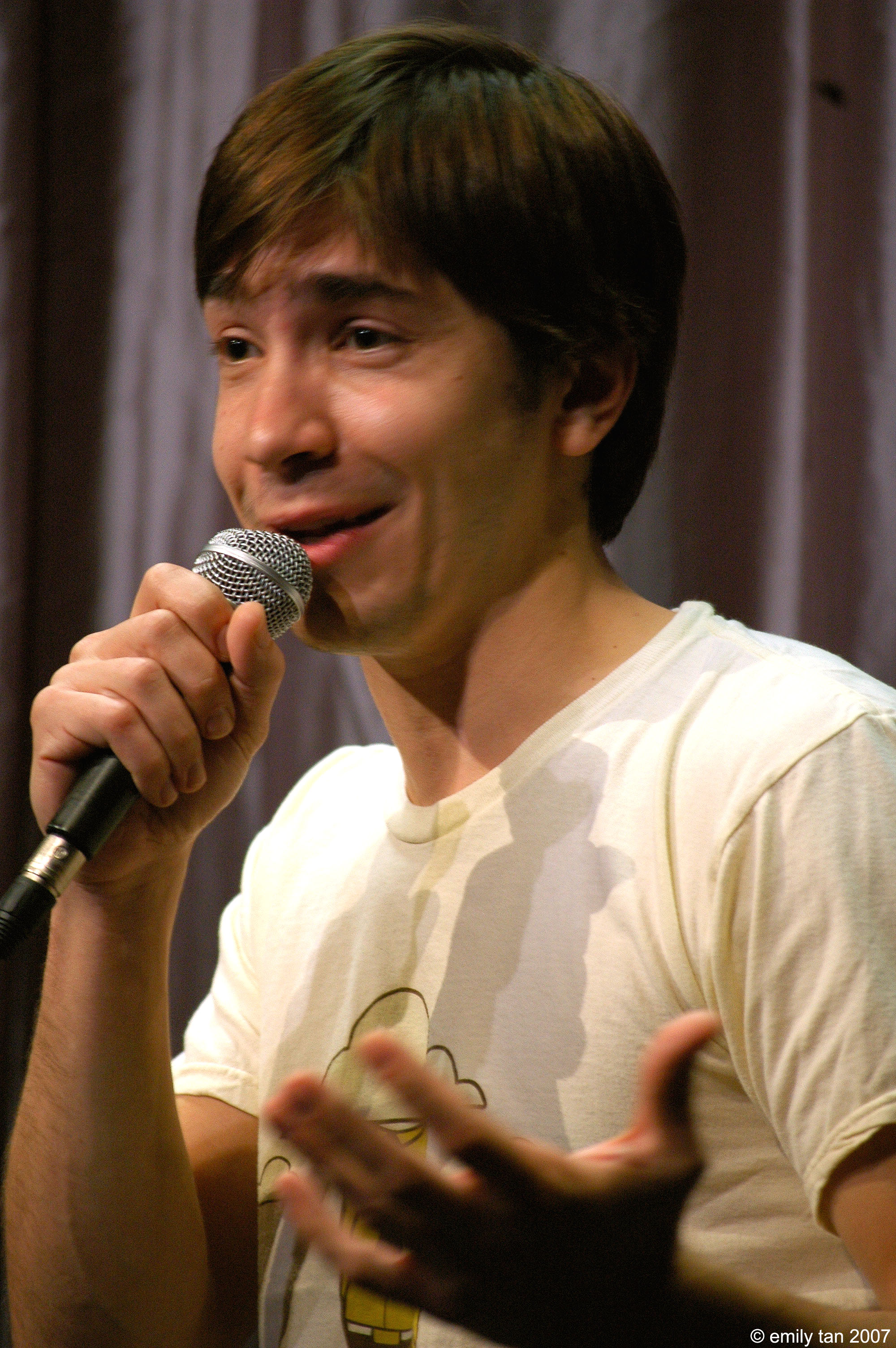
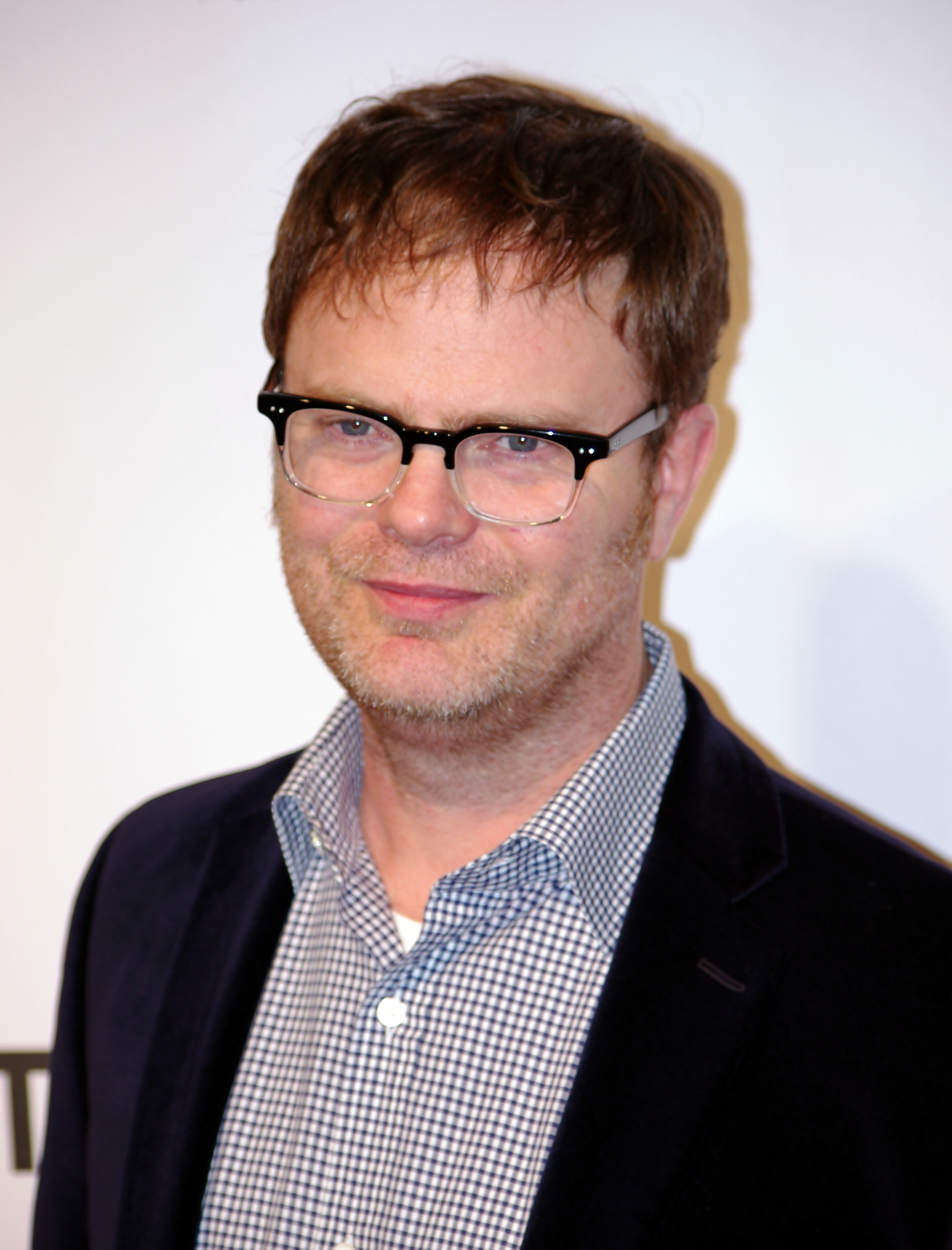
Galaxy Quest was the feature-film debut for both Justin Long (left) and Rainn Wilson.

Justin Long was cast as Brandon, and it was Long's first feature-film role. Long had just completed a pilot for a television show under casting director Bonnie Zane, who suggested Long to her sister Debra Zane, the casting director for Galaxy Quest. Long said he was nervous auditioning as an unknown actor at the time, competing against Kieran Culkin, Eddie Kaye Thomas, and Tom Everett Scott. Parisot had given Long a copy of Trekkies, a film about the Star Trek fandom, to help prepare for the character. Long based his character on a combination of Philip Seymour Hoffman's Scotty J. from Boogie Nights and the Comic Book Guy from The Simpsons. Paul Rudd auditioned for a role.

One of the first "Thermians" to audition was Enrico Colantoni. Colantoni loved the script and spent time before his audition developing the behavior he thought the Thermians should have. Parisot said that at the end of Colantoni's read, the actor offered a possible voice for the Thermians. Parisot immediately loved the voice and used it to establish the nature of the Thermians for the rest of the casting process. Colantoni led how the Thermians would act, which he called "happy Jehovah's Witnesses" taking everything in with "love and acceptance." Other actors cast as Thermians included Jed Rees and Rainn Wilson (his feature-film debut). According to Debra Zane, they had "a difficult time finding an actress to play a Thermian. Ultimately, Zane was so impressed with Missi Pyle's audition that she sent the casting tape directly to Parisot, with a note stating "If this is not Laliari, I will resign from the CSA." Steven Spielberg, also impressed by Pyle and on set for a day, suggested Laliari's role to be expanded, which developed into the romance with Kwan. Jennifer Coolidge also auditioned for the role.

Actors cast as Thermians went to "alien school" to learn how to move and talk, since they were "basically giant calamari hiding in human shape", according to Parisot. The walk was inspired by how the marionettes were articulated in the series Fireball XL5. Other idiosyncrasies were developed by the actors during this training, and several of their lines came out of improvisations. Wilson's role as Lahnk was to have been larger in the film, but the actor was double-booked for an NBC pilot in New York City. He received a crash course on how to act like a Thermian from Colantoni, Rees, and Pyle, but still was nervous around the A-list actors leading the cast. Wilson said that a deleted scene involving Lahnk, released with the film's home media, was wisely cut given how nervous he was, flubbing his lines several times.

=== Filming ===
Linda DeScenna, production designer of the film, was interested in the project because it would not have the same aesthetics as other 1990s science fiction films, and "it didn't have to be real, hi-tech and vacuformed". DeScenna drew inspiration for the sets not only from Star Trek, but also from Buck Rogers, Battlestar Galactica, and Lost in Space. DeScenna had hoped to incorporate more essence of the reuse of props and set elements from these shows within the film, but the film didn't provide enough space for this. She used color theming to help distinguish the key elements of the film, with steam blue for the Thermians and the Protector, while Saris and his species were made to be a green tone that stood out against that. The design of the Thermian station was influenced by the works of artist Roger Dean, especially his cover art for the Yes live album Yessongs (1973).

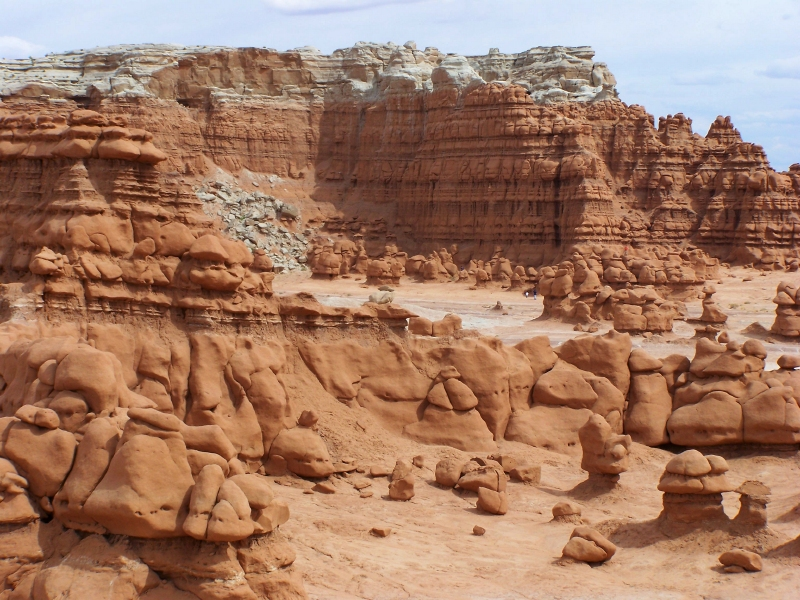
Goblin Valley State Park was used for the scenes on the alien planet.

The bulk of the film was shot in studios in Los Angeles. Scenes of the alien planet were filmed at Goblin Valley State Park in Utah. At the time, access to the park was partly by dirt road; fees paid by the production company were used to upgrade the entire access road to asphalt pavement. Other locations used in the film included the Stahl House as Nesmith's home and the Hollywood Palladium for the fan conventions.

According to Weaver, Allen hectored her to sign a piece of the Nostromo, the spaceship from Alien, in which she had starred; she ultimately did, writing "Stolen by Tim Allen; Love, Sigourney Weaver", which she claims upset him greatly. During the period of filming, the entire cast attended a 20th-anniversary screening of Alien. After filming wrapped, Weaver kept the wig she wore for the role.

The film's visual effects were created by Industrial Light & Magic (ILM) led by Bill George. A challenge in the CGI was making distinctions between scenes that were to be from the 1980s Galaxy Quest show, which would have been done normally through practical effects, and the more realistic scenes for the contemporary actors. Various practical effects were also used, such as the "piglizard" creature that the crew transports onto the Protector.

=== Post-production ===
After most production was done, Johnson said that DreamWorks was confused by the film, as it was not what they had expected from the script they greenlit, but pushed on post-production as they needed a film to compete with Columbia Pictures' Stuart Little. The film originally received an "R" rating, according to Collins and Weaver, before being recut to achieve a family-friendly rating. Shalhoub did not remember any darker version of the film. Gordon had not planned to write a "family-friendly" film, and his initial script included mature scenes, such as DeMarco attempting to seduce aliens, and the crash of the escape pod into the convention hall decapitating several attendees.

While Galaxy Quest was in post-production, Paramount released The Rugrats Movie, which was a box-office success. DreamWorks at that point pushed to have Galaxy Quest tailored for a younger audience to compete with Rugrats. According to the cast and crew, Galaxy Quest was re-edited to achieve a "PG" rating, requiring scenes to be cut that could have survived if a "PG-13" rating had been targeted instead. In the "chompers" scene, DeMarco's line "Well, screw that!" was dubbed over her original "Well, fuck that!" Weaver stated she purposely made her dubbed line stand out as a form of protest from her original line. Several scenes involving Dr. Lazarus were cut, as DreamWorks felt they were too kinky for the desired rating. One cut scene showed Dr. Lazarus' crew quarters on the Protector, which Allen called a "proctologist's dream and nightmare." Other scenes were added to provide what DreamWorks felt was necessary continuity for the intended younger audience, such as showing the limo with Nesmith and the aliens "beaming up" from Earth.

In theaters, the first 20 minutes of the film were presented in a 1.85:1 aspect ratio (minus the opening showing clips from the TV show which were in 1.33:1), before changing to a wider 2.35:1 ratio when Nesmith looks out upon space as the Protector arrives at Thermia to maximize the effect on viewers. However, this caused some problems with projectionists at movie theaters when showing the film as they had not opened up the screen curtains far enough for the wider aspect ratio. Projectionists had to be told at later showings to prepare for this transition. On the DVD and Blu-ray Disc releases, however, after the opening scene showing the TV clips, it goes directly from 1.33:1 to 2.35:1 and remains that way for the rest of the movie.

David Newman composed the score.

=== Promotion ===
Before the release, a promotional mockumentary video titled Galaxy Quest: 20th Anniversary, The Journey Continues, aired on E!, presenting the Galaxy Quest television series as an actual cult series, and the upcoming film as a documentary about the making of the series, presenting it in a similar way to Star Trek; it featured fake interviews of the series' cast (portrayed by the actors of the actual film), "Questerians", and critics.

While these additional materials were made, DreamWorks devoted very little advertising to the film despite its placement near the Christmas season, which the cast and crew felt hurt the potential for the film. Unlike most films where the second and ongoing weekend box office takes decline, Galaxy Quest saw rising numbers over the first several weekends, and DreamWorks' Jeffrey Katzenberg apologized directly to Parisot for failing to market the film properly. Additionally, the primary trailer used for the film used a cut of the film before all the specific effects were complete, and Johnson felt that if the trailer had used the completed versions, it would have helped draw a larger audience.

=== Relation to Star Trek and other science fiction works ===
Galaxy Quest is an acknowledged homage to Star Trek; Parisot said "Part of the mission for me was to make a great 'Star Trek' episode." Gordon's original script was titled Galaxy Quest: The Motion Picture as a reference to the first feature Star Trek film, and elements such as departing the space dock and the malfunctioning transporters were further nods to the film. The prefix of the Protector's registration number NTE-3120 ostensibly alludes to some sort of similar space federation, but in reality stands for "Not The Enterprise", according to visual effects co-supervisor Bill George. Parisot refuted claims that the rock monster that Nesmith battled was based on the rock monster that had been scripted for Star Trek V: The Final Frontier, but instead was more inspired by the Gorn that Kirk faces in the Star Trek episode "Arena". This homage also extended to the original marketing of the movie, including a promotional website intentionally designed to look like a poorly constructed fan website, with "screen captures" and poor HTML coding.

Other aspects of the film were homages to other seminal science fiction works. The Thermians' native planet, Klaatu Nebula, is a reference to the name of the alien visitor in the classic The Day the Earth Stood Still (1951). Quellek's line "I'm shot" was influenced by the same line from James Brolin's character in Westworld. The blue creatures on the alien planet were based on similar creatures in Barbarella. The "chompers" scene with Nesmith and DeMarco trying to reach the self-destruct abort button was inspired by a scene from the 1997 film Event Horizon involving whirring blades. The effects for the Omega 13 activation were inspired by the ending scene from Beneath the Planet of the Apes.

In his review of Galaxy Quest, James Berardinelli states that the movie shares the "same central conceit" with a short story by Ruth Berman titled "Visit to a Weird Planet Revisited" published in the 1976 anthology Star Trek: New Voyages in which William Shatner, Leonard Nimoy and DeForest Kelley are transported to the real Enterprise while filming an episode of Star Trek and are pursued by Klingons.

== Reception ==
=== Critical response ===
On the review aggregator website Rotten Tomatoes, 90% of 132 critics' reviews are positive, with an average rating of 7.3/10. The website's consensus reads: "Intelligent and humorous satire with an excellent cast – no previous Trekkie knowledge needed to enjoy this one." Metacritic, which uses a weighted average, assigned the film a score of 70 out of 100, based on 28 critics, indicating "generally favorable" reviews.

Critics praised it both as a parody of Star Trek, and as a comedy film of its own. The New York Times's Lawrence Van Gelder called it "an amiable comedy that simultaneously manages to spoof these popular futuristic space adventures and replicate the very elements that have made them so durable". Roger Ebert, writing for the Chicago Sun-Times, praised the ability of the film to spoof the "illogic of the TV show". Amy Taubin of The Village Voice offered a lukewarm review, noting that "the many eight- to 11-year-olds in the audience seemed completely enthralled". Joe Leydon of Variety said that Galaxy Quest "remains light and bright as it races along, and never turns nasty or mean-spirited as it satirizes the cliches and cults of Star Trek".

Retrospective reviews for Galaxy Quest have been positive. Esquire's Matt Miller said in 2019 "the film absolutely holds up as one of the best sci-fi satires ever made—one that challenges our obsession with massive Hollywood franchises, the nature of fandom, and some of the more problematic cliches of the genre. But it does so with a self-aware empathy that makes it an enduring and lasting entry in not only science-fiction, but American film as a whole". Writer-director David Mamet, in his book Bambi vs. Godzilla: On the Nature, Purpose, and Practice of the Movie Business, included Galaxy Quest in a list of four "perfect" films, along with The Godfather, A Place in the Sun and Dodsworth. The film has been described by fans and critics as one of the best Star Trek films, despite not being part of the franchise.

=== Box office ===
Galaxy Quest grossed $71.6 million in the United States and Canada, and $19.1 million in other territories, for a worldwide total of $90.7 million, double the original budget of $45 million, which means the movie essentially broke even after distribution, theater & ticket sales taxes were deducted, as a movie typically has to double its gross to break even. It spent its first nine weeks in the Top 10 at the box office.

=== Accolades ===
List of awards and nominations
Award	Date of ceremony	Category	Recipient(s)	Result
Amsterdam Fantastic Film Festival	April 13, 2000	Silver Scream Award	Dean Parisot	Won
Artios Awards	November 1, 2000	Best Casting for Feature Film, Comedy	Debra Zane	Nominated
Blockbuster Entertainment Awards	May 9, 2000	Favorite Actor – Comedy	Tim Allen	Nominated
Blockbuster Entertainment Awards	May 9, 2000	Favorite Actress – Comedy	Sigourney Weaver	Nominated
Brussels International Festival of Fantastic Film	April 1, 2000	Silver Raven for Best Screenplay	David Howard	Won
Brussels International Festival of Fantastic Film	April 1, 2000	Pegasus Audience Award	Dean Parisot	Won
Hochi Film Awards	December 27, 2001	Best Foreign Language Film	Dean Parisot	Won
Hugo Awards	September 4, 2001	Best Dramatic Presentation	Dean Parisot, David Howard and Robert Gordon	Won
Las Vegas Film Critics Society Awards	January 18, 2000	Best Visual Effects	Bill George	Nominated
Nebula Awards	April 28, 2001	Best Script	David Howard and Robert Gordon	Nominated
Saturn Awards	June 6, 2000	Best Science Fiction Film	Galaxy Quest	Nominated
Saturn Awards	June 6, 2000	Best Director	Dean Parisot	Nominated
Saturn Awards	June 6, 2000	Best Actor	Tim Allen	Won
Saturn Awards	June 6, 2000	Best Actress	Sigourney Weaver	Nominated
Saturn Awards	June 6, 2000	Best Supporting Actor	Alan Rickman	Nominated
Saturn Awards	June 6, 2000	Best Performance by a Younger Actor	Justin Long	Nominated
Saturn Awards	June 6, 2000	Best Music	David Newman	Nominated
Saturn Awards	June 6, 2000	Best Costume	Albert Wolsky	Nominated
Saturn Awards	June 6, 2000	Best Make-up	Stan Winston, Hallie D'Amore and Ve Neill	Nominated
Saturn Awards	June 6, 2000	Best Special Effects	Stan Winston, Bill George, Kim Bromley and Robert Stadd	Nominated
Teen Choice Awards	August 6, 2000	Choice Movie – Comedy	Galaxy Quest	Nominated

=== Impact and legacy ===
The film proved popular with Star Trek fans. At the 2013 Star Trek Convention in Las Vegas, Galaxy Quest received enough support in a Star Trek Film Ranking to be included with the twelve Star Trek films that had been released at the time on the voting ballot. The fans at the convention ranked it the seventh-best Star Trek film. Tim Allen said he and William Shatner were "now friends because of this movie".

Galaxy Quest predicted the growth and influence of media fandom in the years after its release. While fandoms such as that for Star Trek existed at the time of the film, the size and scope presented by the fan conventions in the film had not been seen as much in 1999; since then, major fan conventions such as San Diego Comic-Con have become significant events that draw mainstream attention. The film also depicted fandoms using their numbers to influence production companies to revive cancelled works, such as with The Expanse, Veronica Mars, Arrested Development, and Twin Peaks. The film also captured some negative elements of modern fandom, such as leading actors continuously pestered by fans for intricate details of the work's fiction and other elements of the potentially toxic culture of online fan groups. The novella Rabbit Remembered (2000) by John Updike mentions the character of Laliari from the film.

==== Reaction from Star Trek actors ====
Several actors who have had roles in various Star Trek television series and films have commented on Galaxy Quest in light of their own experiences with the franchise and its fandom. Tim Russ (Tuvok on Voyager) professed to enjoying the movie. Patrick Stewart (Jean-Luc Picard on TNG) originally did not want to see it because he heard it was making fun of Star Trek, but Jonathan Frakes told him to see it. Stewart enjoyed it greatly, especially the tribute to fans' dedication. Wil Wheaton (Wesley Crusher on TNG) enjoyed the satire of Star Trek and fandom in general, and he wished he was cast as "a freaky fanboy who keeps screaming at the actor who played 'the kid' about how awful it was that there was a kid on the spaceship." George Takei (Hikaru Sulu on TOS) called it "a chillingly realistic documentary" and said "I do believe that when we get kidnapped by aliens, it's going to be the genuine, true Star Trek fans who will save the day". On the other hand, Casey Biggs (Damar on DS9) said "Yes, I have seen Galaxy Quest and no, it's not really like that." William Shatner (James T. Kirk on TOS) found it funny and liked the portrayal of the audience, but claimed he did not recognize the actors they were pretending to be apart from "the girl playing Nichelle Nichols"

== Related media ==
=== Home video ===
The film was released by DreamWorks Home Entertainment on VHS and DVD on May 2, 2000. The DVD version included a 10-minute behind-the-scenes feature, cast and crew biographies and interviews, and deleted scenes. During February 2006, Viacom (now known as Paramount Skydance) acquired the rights to Galaxy Quest and all other live-action films DreamWorks had released between 1997 and 2005, following its billion-dollar acquisition of the studio's live-action film and television assets. This deal put the film under the same corporate umbrella as the Star Trek franchise, which has been produced by Paramount Television and Paramount Pictures. A special 10th anniversary deluxe edition was released on both DVD and Blu-ray by Paramount Home Entertainment on May 12, 2009; though they lacked the same features on the original DVD release, they included several new featurettes on the film's history, the cast, and the special effects used in the film's making, alongside the deleted scenes. For the film's 20th anniversary, a "Never Give Up, Never Surrender Edition" Blu-ray was released on November 5, 2019, featuring the same features as the 10th edition; a special SteelBook Best Buy exclusive was released on September 17, 2019. For the film's 25th anniversary, a 4K Ultra HD Blu-ray edition was released on December 3, 2024, by Paramount Home Entertainment. This edition includes the bonus features from the 10th anniversary deluxe edition, as well as a new interview with director Dean Parisot. This edition is the first home video release to have the original theatrical aspect ratio changes.

=== Tie-in media ===
In November 1999, Galaxy Quest was novelized by science fiction writer Terry Bisson, who stayed very close to the plot of the film.

In 2008, IDW Publishing released a comic book sequel to the movie entitled Galaxy Quest: Global Warning. In January 2015, IDW launched a four-issue series set several years after the events of the film called "Galaxy Quest: The Journey Continues". In 2021, Eaglemoss Publications released a behind-the-scenes book entitled Galaxy Quest: The Inside Story.

=== Proposed sequel or television series ===
Talks of a sequel have been going on since the film's release in 1999, but only began gaining traction in 2014 when Allen mentioned that there was a script. Stars Weaver and Rockwell mentioned they were interested in returning. However, Colantoni has said he would prefer for there not to be a sequel, lest it tarnish the characters from the first film. He said, "to make something up, just because we love those characters, and turn it into a sequel—then it becomes the awful sequel".

In April 2015, Paramount Television, along with the movie's co-writer Gordon, director Parisot, and executive producers Johnson and Bernstein, announced they were looking to develop a television series based on Galaxy Quest. The move was considered in a similar vein as Paramount's revivals of Minority Report and School of Rock as television series. In August 2015, it was announced that Amazon Studios would be developing it.

In January 2016, after the unexpected death of Alan Rickman from pancreatic cancer, Tim Allen commented in The Hollywood Reporter about the franchise's chance of a revival:

I'm not supposed to say anything—I'm speaking way out of turn here—but Galaxy Quest is really close to being resurrected in a very creative way. It's closer than I can tell you but I can't say more than that. The real kicker is that Alan now has to be left out. It's been a big shock on many levels.

Speaking to the Nerdist podcast in April 2016, Sam Rockwell revealed that the cast had been about ready to sign on for a follow-up with Amazon, but Rickman's death, together with Allen's television schedule, had proved to be obstacles. He also said he believed Rickman's death meant the project would never happen.

However, the plans were revived in August 2017, with the announcement that Paul Scheer would be writing the series. Speaking to /Film, Scheer said that in his first drafts submitted to Amazon in November 2017 he wanted to create a serialized adventure that starts where the film ends, but leads into the cultural shift in Star Trek that has occurred since 1999; he said "I really wanted to capture the difference between the original cast of Star Trek and the J. J. Abrams cast of Star Trek." To that end, Scheer's initial scripts called for two separate cast sets that would come together by the end of the first season of the show, though he did not confirm if this included any of the original film's cast.

Following the dismissal of Amy Powell as president of Paramount Television in July 2018, Scheer said the Galaxy Quest series had been put on hold while Paramount's management was being re-established, but anticipated the show would continue forward after that. He also said they were making the series to allow the introduction of new characters while extending the setting, similar to what Star Wars: The Force Awakens did for A New Hope.

Allen stated that a film sequel script is nearly ready to go as of January 2021. The script had been near completion for production by 2016 but with Rickman's death, it would have to undergo major rewrites as the core story focused on the relationship between Nesmith and Dane (Allen and Rickman's characters, respectively). A central plot element was to have the Protector and its crew affected by time dilation during space flight, which Allen considered a boon for the uncertain production of the film. While Allen said there were no immediate efforts for the sequel's production, he and the other cast and crew keep circulating the idea and believe it would be easy to restart the effort.

Georgia Pritchett stated in a June 2021 interview that she and Simon Pegg were working on developing a Galaxy Quest television series. Paramount was stated to be in the early stages of a Galaxy Quest series in April 2023 for the Paramount+ streaming service, with production overseen by Johnson.

=== Documentary ===
Never Surrender: A Galaxy Quest Documentary was produced by the web site Fandom in 2019 to celebrate the film's 20th anniversary. Titled after Captain Taggart's catchphrase "Never give up, never surrender!", it features interviews with the movie's cast and crew, including Allen, Weaver, Rockwell, Shalhoub, Long, Pyle, Wilson, and Mitchell, along with director Parisot and writer Gordon, as well as celebrities including Wil Wheaton, Brent Spiner, Greg Berlanti, Paul Scheer, and Damon Lindelof, who have spoken of their love for the film. Initially premiering to a limited audience at the October 2019 New York Comic Con, it subsequently had a limited theatrical showing at about 600 screens through Fathom Events on November 26, 2019, which included a screening of deleted scenes as well as the debut of Screen Junkies' "Honest Trailer" for Galaxy Quest. The film was made available on various digital media services for purchase in December 2019.

== See also ==
- List of cult films
