= Wild Horse Butte =

Mountain in Emery County, Utah, United States

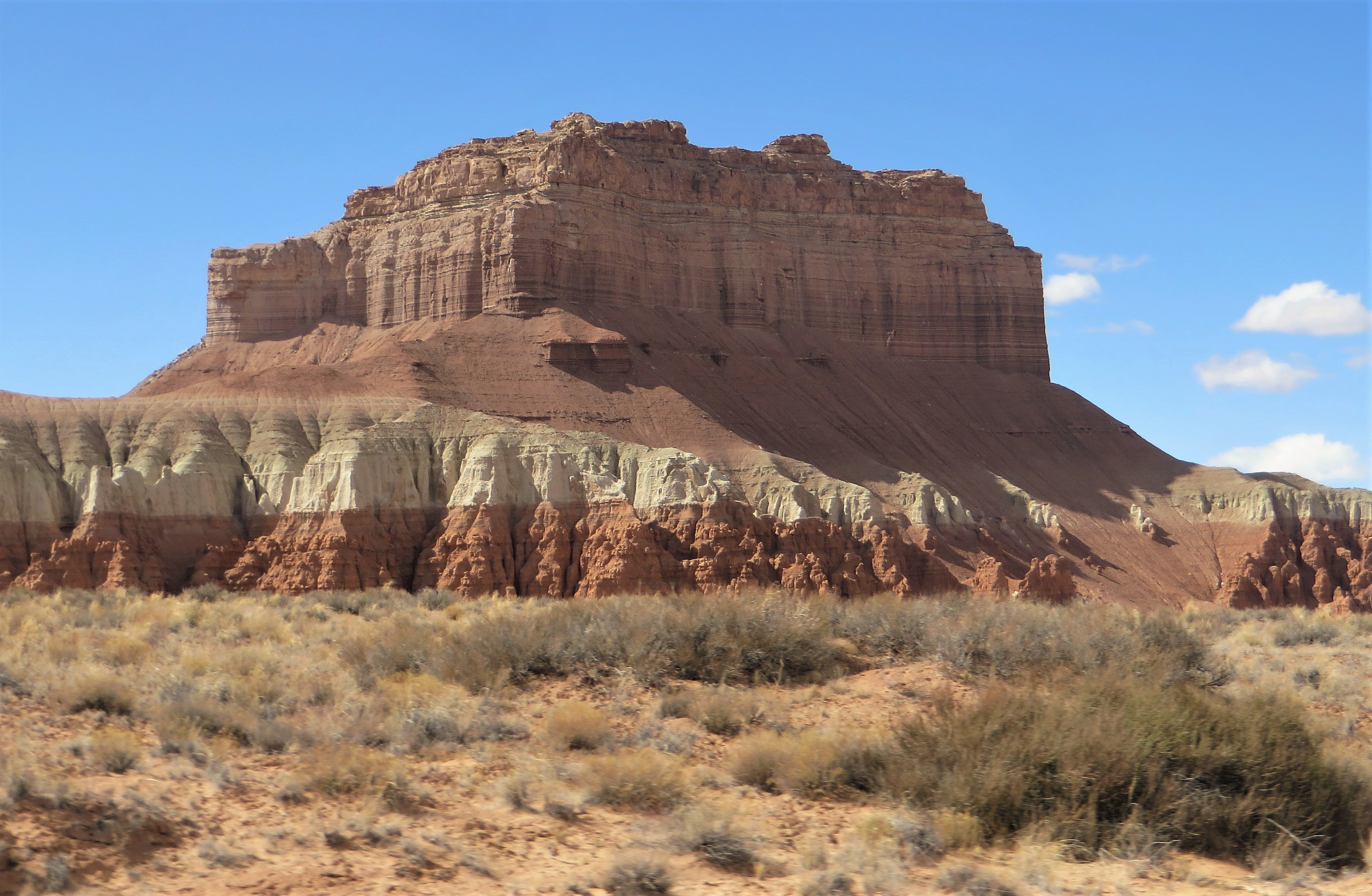
- Wild Horse Butte

Highest point
- Elevation: 5,760 ft (1,760 m)
- Prominence: 760 ft (230 m)
- Parent peak: Point 6260
- Isolation: 3.84 mi (6.18 km)
- Coordinates: 38°34′43″N 110°43′12″W

Geography
- Location within Utah Location within the United States
- Country: United States
- State: Utah
- County: Emery
- Protected area: Goblin Valley State Park
- Parent range: Colorado Plateau
- Topo map: USGS Goblin Valley

Geology
- Rock age: Jurassic
- Rock type(s): shale, siltstone, sandstone

Wild Horse Butte is a 5,760-foot (1,756-meter) elevation summit located in Goblin Valley State Park, in Emery County, Utah. Wild Horse Butte is situated 2.3 mi (3.7 km) west of Mollys Castle, and the top of this geological feature rises over 800 feet above its surrounding terrain, with precipitation runoff from Wild Horse Butte entering the Colorado River drainage basin. John C. Frémont's fifth expedition (1853–1854) stopped at Wild Horse Butte in January 1854, when Solomon Nunes Carvalho recorded a daguerreotype image of this butte.

== Geology ==
This butte is set within the San Rafael Desert on the southeastern edge of the San Rafael Swell. Wild Horse Butte is composed of four exposed formations of Jurassic rock. The top layer is Morrison Formation caprock. The Morrison Formation is famous for dinosaur bones found within it. Although no dinosaur bone discoveries have been reported on Wild Horse Butte, they have been found just west in this formation. This overlays the cliff-forming Summerville Formation, which consists of distinctive, thin beds of shale, siltstone, and sandstone. Thin beds and veinlets of gypsum found within the shale suggest a dry climate where ponded tidal water readily evaporated. Below Summerville is the slope-forming, lightly-colored Curtis Formation. The bottom layer is dark, reddish Entrada Sandstone, which is also the composition of the hoodoos that give Goblin Valley its name.

== Climate ==
Spring and fall are the most favorable seasons to visit Wild Horse Butte. According to the Köppen climate classification system, it is located in a Cold semi-arid climate zone, which is defined by the coldest month having an average mean temperature below −0 °C (32 °F) and at least 50% of the total annual precipitation being received during the spring and summer. This desert climate receives less than 10 inches (250 millimetres) of annual rainfall, and snowfall is generally light during the winter.

== Gallery ==
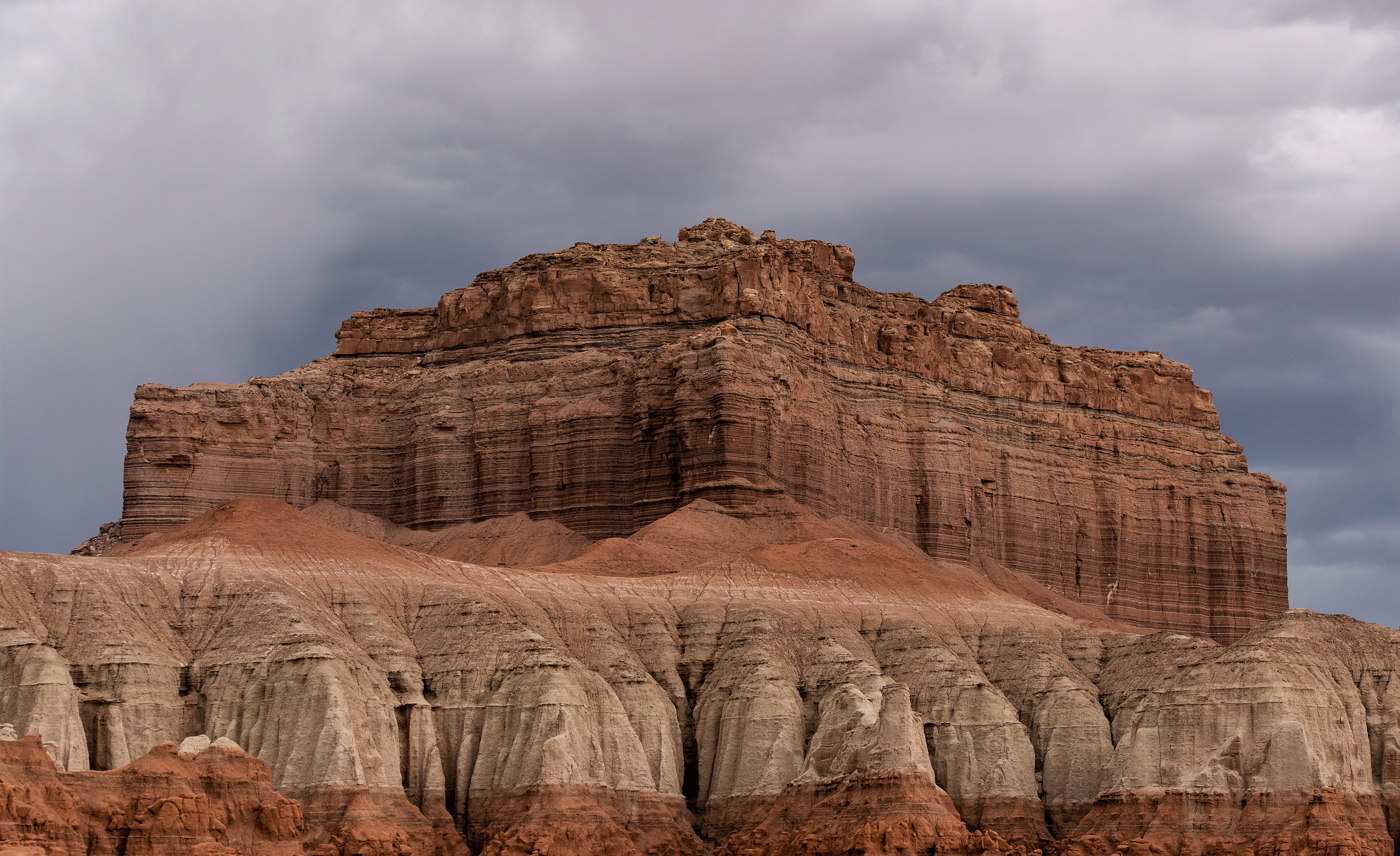
Top to bottom: Morrison Formation, Summerville, Curtis, Entrada Sandstone.

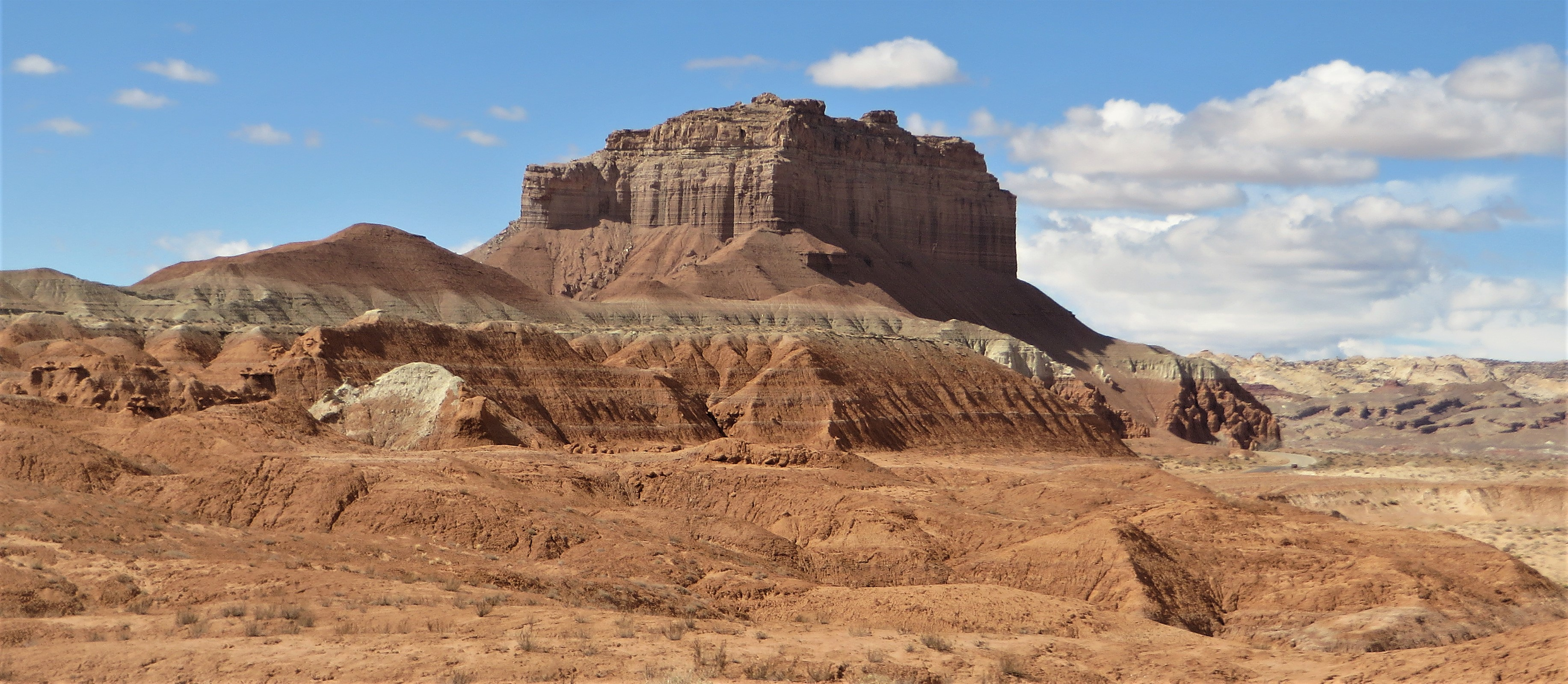

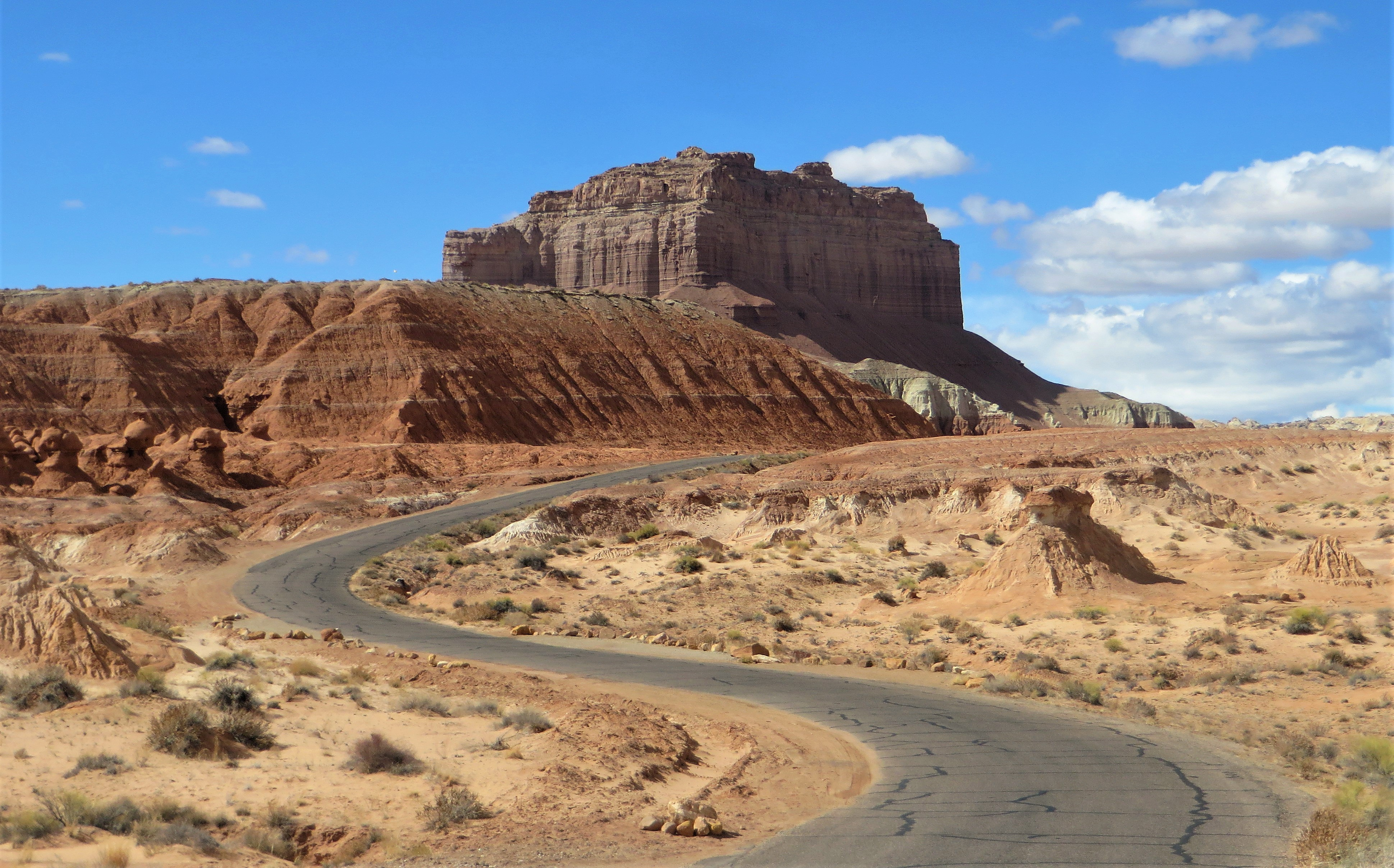

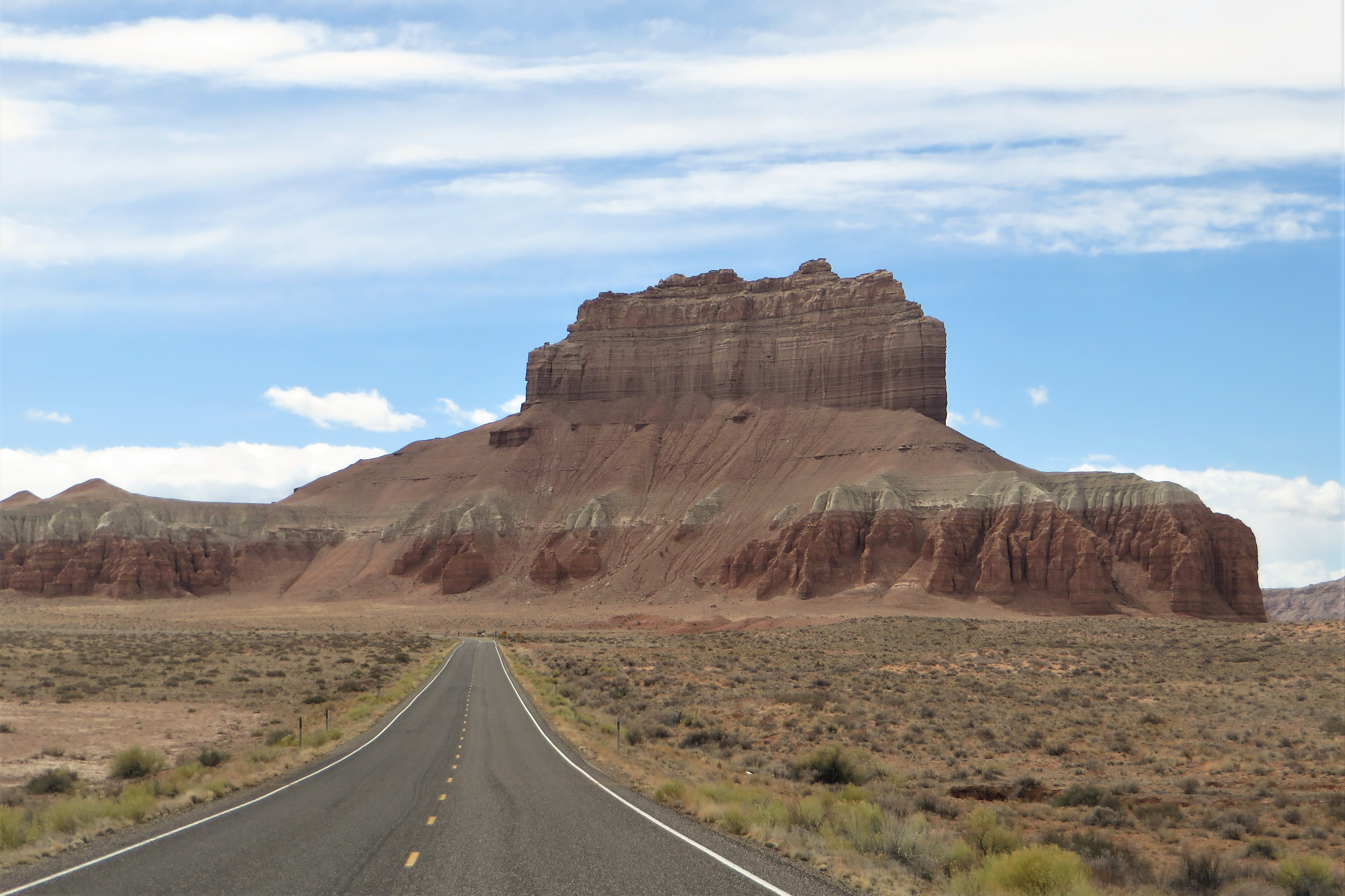

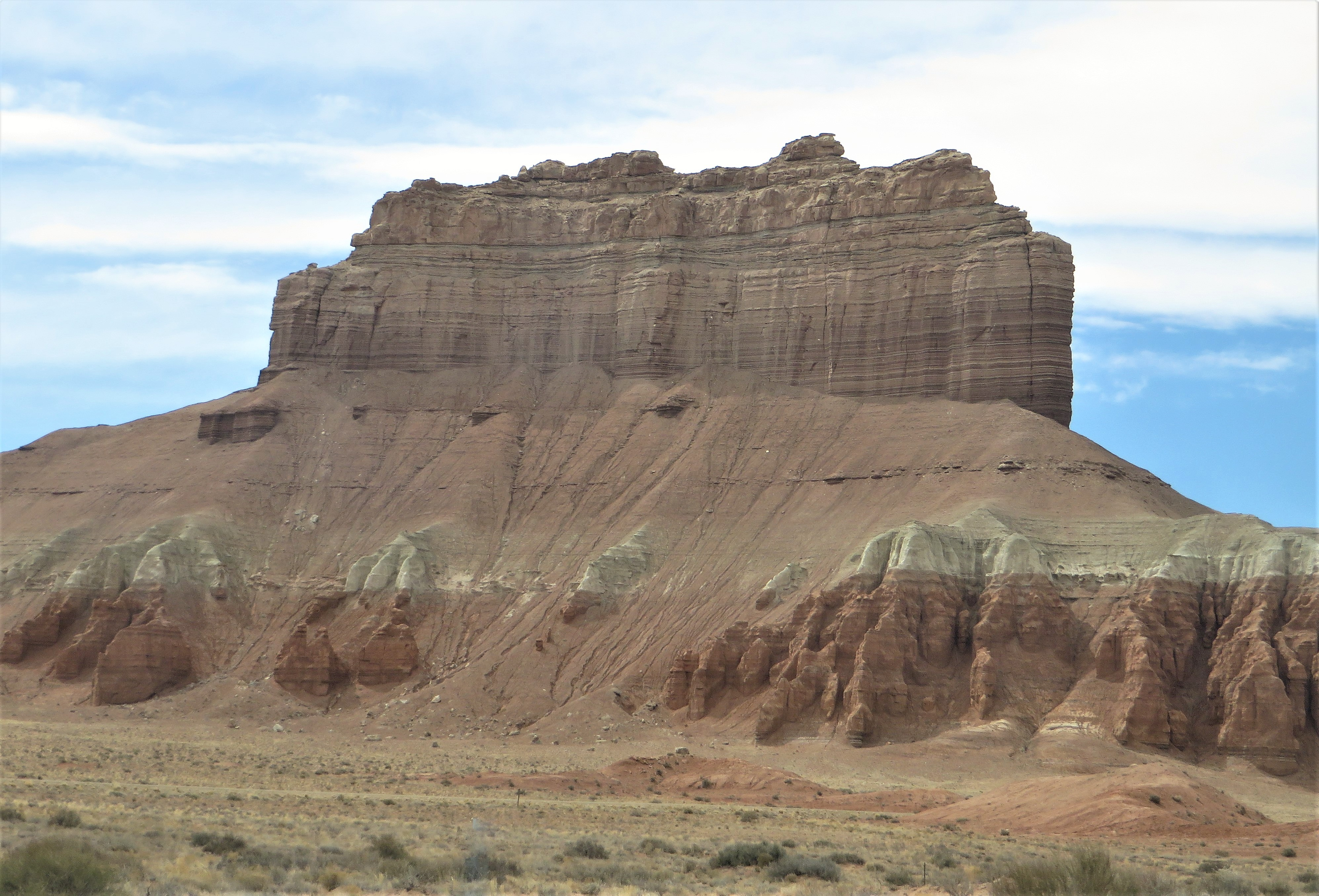

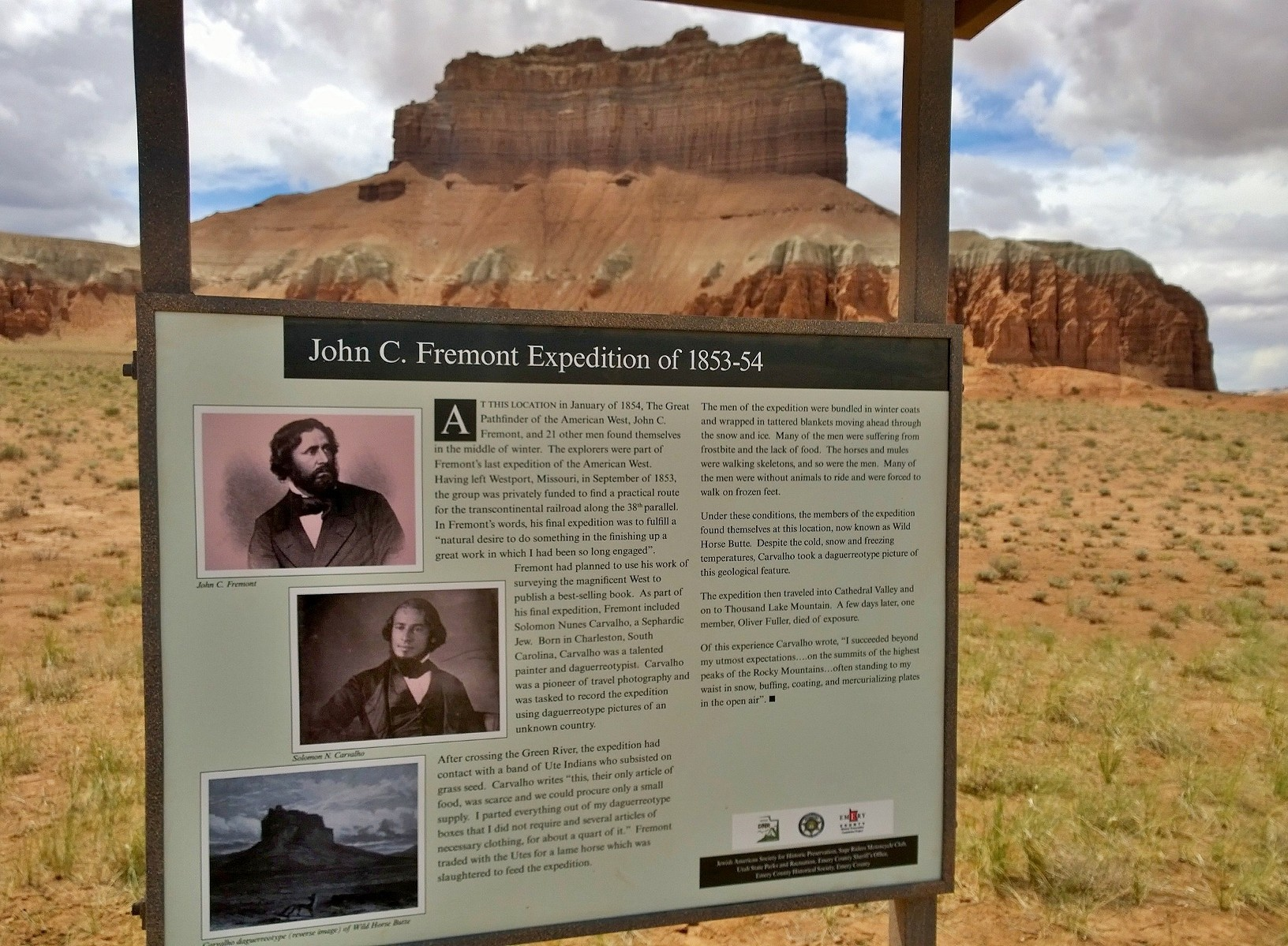

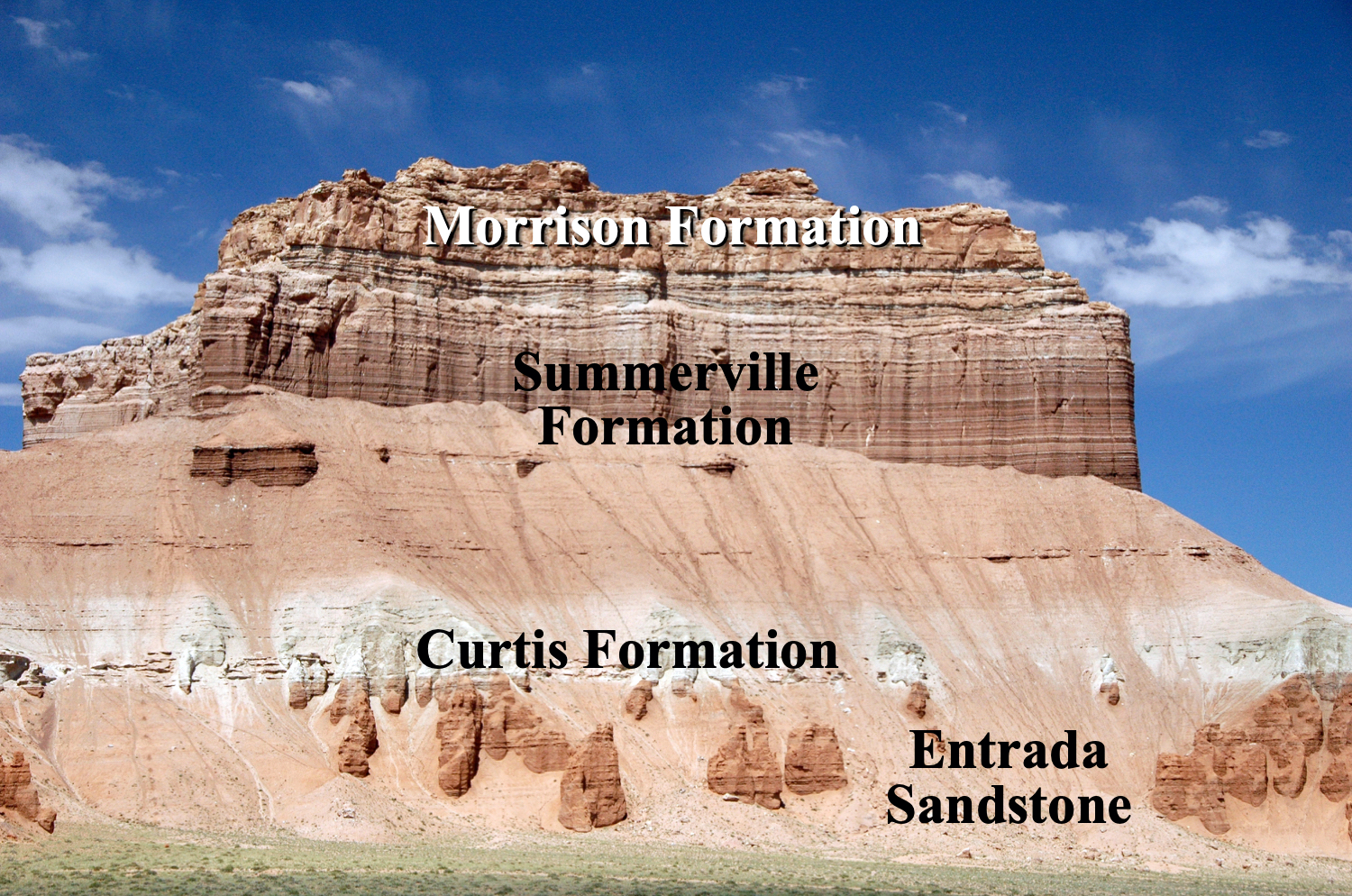

== See also ==
- Colorado Plateau
