= Scott Lobdell =

American screenwriter and comic book writer

- Born: 1960 (age 65–66)
- Area: Writer
- Notable works: Uncanny X-Men; Generation X Red Hood and the Outlaws; Teen Titans; Superman; Alpha Flight; Happy Death Day

Scott Lobdell (/ˈlɒbdɛl/; born 1960) is an American comic book writer and screenwriter known for his work on numerous X-Men series for Marvel Comics in the 1990s, various work for DC Comics in the 2010s, namely Red Hood and the Outlaws, Teen Titans, and Superman, and comics for other publishers, including the Hardy Boys: Undercover Brothers series by Papercutz or Fathom by Aspen MLT. He also wrote the script of the 2017 comedy-horror film Happy Death Day.

== Career ==
=== Early career ===
Lobdell did not begin to read comics until he was 17 years old, while lying in bed after lung surgery. Later, he went to college to study psychology, but quit two years later when he began to write. While in college, he wrote for the college newspaper and interviewed Marvel editor Al Milgrom. Lobdell started submitting various stories to Marvel, but was systematically rejected by various editors, including Tom DeFalco. Later, DeFalco started editing Marvel Comics Presents (a bi-weekly book) requiring many writers, pencillers and inkers. Lobdell submitted a story about a character from Contest of Champions. Because the characters involved were rather obscure, DeFalco did not need to extract approval from other editors, and he decided to give Lobdell a chance.

=== Marvel Comics ===
In the 1990s, Lobdell worked on Marvel Comics' X-Men-related titles, specifically Uncanny X-Men and the spin-off series Generation X. He wrote the first 28 issues of Generation X along with runs on Excalibur and X-Factor. Lobdell was the primary creative force behind most of the major X-title related storylines throughout a majority of the 1990s, including "X-Cutioner's Song", "Fatal Attractions", "Phalanx Covenant", "Age of Apocalypse", the "Onslaught" saga, and "Operation: Zero Tolerance".

Lobdell had writing stints on Marvel's Daredevil, Alpha Flight, The Adventures of Cyclops and Phoenix and early issues of Iron Man and Fantastic Four during the "Heroes Reborn" event. Lobdell wrote the 1992 issue of Alpha Flight in which the superhero Northstar – originally intended to be gay, but closeted by the publisher's existing policy against openly LGBT characters – declared that he is gay, in a storyline intended to also address the HIV/AIDS epidemic.

Lobdell returned to Marvel in 2001 to conclude plots he left behind with one last storyline, "Eve of Destruction", as well as the epilogue of Gambit, co-plotted with Joe Pruett with pencils by Georges Jeanty.

=== Other work ===
Lobdell wrote the script to Stan Lee's Mosaic and an unmade film from POW! Entertainment featuring Ringo Starr. He also participated in the Marvel Comics and Image Comics (from Jim Lee's WildStorm) crossover mini-series WildC.A.T.s/X-Men.

In 2008, Lobdell became the regular writer for Galaxy Quest, a series published by IDW Publishing, with art by Ilias Kyriazis, centered on the eve of the relaunch of the Galaxy Quest series, now titled Galaxy Quest: The Journey Continues.

To date, he has written the majority of The Hardy Boys Graphic Novel series by Papercutz.

Lobdell has also performed as a stand-up comedian.

Lobdell created Paranormal Activity: The Search for Katie with art from Mark Badger it was released in December 2009 on iPhone.

Lobdell wrote the screenplay for Blumhouse’s slasher film Happy Death Day. The film was released on October 13, 2017 by Universal Pictures.

Lobdell's original comic book series Ball and Chain sold to Netflix on May 14, 2020. The comic is being adapted into a feature film starring Dwayne "the Rock" Johnson and Emily Blunt. Emily V. Gordon is writing the screenplay.

=== DC Comics ===
In 2011, Lobdell took on the writing duties for Red Hood and the Outlaws, which debuted as part of DC Comics' company-wide title relaunch, The New 52. His portrayal of Starfire/Koriand'r in the first issue was criticized as shallow and sexist by some critics.

He also wrote a new Teen Titans comic starring Red Robin, Superboy, Wonder Girl, Kid Flash, and three new characters, including the gay Hispanic superhero Bunker. His run on Teen Titans ended with Volume 4 Issue 30, the series was relaunched soon afterwards.

In 2019, Lobdell wrote a new Flash book focusing on Wally West following the limited series Heroes in Crisis, titled Flash Forward, which began publication in November.

=== Awards ===
His work has won him recognition in the comic books industry, such as a nomination for the Comics Buyer's Guide Award for "Favorite Writer" in 1997.

== Controversy ==
In 2011, Lobdell explained that among the reasons he no longer had a social media presence was the unintended spillover from his personal to professional life, and a run-in he had had with writer Ron Marz on Twitter. Lobdell had accused Marz of having a "brain tumor" in response to comments in which Marz characterized as "racist" complaints by some fans that Afro-Latino character Miles Morales would replace Peter Parker in Ultimate Spider-Man, and that African-American actor Laurence Fishburne had been cast as Perry White in the film Man of Steel.

In 2013, Lobdell identified himself on stage during a Prism Comics panel at Long Beach Comic Con as the comic book artist/writer MariNaomi referred to in an article MariNaomi had submitted to XoJane describing how they had been sexually harassed by an unnamed fellow panelist, who had questioned their sexuality on stage, made offensive comments about their appearance and Asian features, and made sexually inappropriate jokes about them during the panel. Lobdell later identified himself as the panelist in question, and issued an "apology" to MariNaomi through Heidi MacDonald of ComicsBeat.com.

== Bibliography ==
=== Comics ===
- Angel: Only Human
- The Adventures of Cyclops and Phoenix (4-issue mini-series)
- Alpha Flight (vol. 3) #1–12
- Ball and Chain (4-issue mini-series)
- Buffy the Vampire Slayer (with Fabian Nicieza) #47–59
- Daredevil #376–379
- The Darkness #23–38
- Excalibur #31, #35–41, #53, #58–60, #68–71, #75–82
- Fantastic Four (vol. 3) #1–3, 4–5 (with Chris Claremont, 1998)
- Flash Forward #1–6
- Galaxy Quest #1–5
- Gen^{13} #45–54
- Generation X #1–28
- Ghostbusters: Displaced Aggression #1–4
- Iron Man (vol. 2) #1–7 (1996)
- Manifest Eternity #1–6 (Wildstorm, 2006)
- Nightwing (vol. 4) #51–58
- Red Hood and the Outlaws (vol. 1) #0–18, 32–40, Annual #2 (2011–2015), Red Hood and the Outlaws Rebirth #1, (vol. 2) #1–50, Annuals #1–3 (retitled Red Hood: Outlaw)
- Red Hood/Arsenal (2015–2016)
- Teen Titans (vol. 4) (2011-2014)
- Uncanny X-Men #286–349, 350 (with Steven Seagle), #390–393
- Wildcats #1–9 (1997)
- X-Factor #90–95, #106
- X-Men (vol. 2) #6–11, #46–69, #110–113
- The Anybodies (Kickstarter) #1 (Take the Money and Run Edition)

=== Television and film ===
- Godzilla: The Series S2 ep.3 (1999)
- Man of the House (2005)
- Mosaic (2007)
- Happy Death Day (2017)
- Critters Attack! (2019)

Preceded by Chris Claremont	Excalibur writer 1991	Succeeded by Alan Davis
Preceded by John Byrne	Uncanny X-Men writer 1992–1997	Succeeded by Steve Seagle
Preceded by Alan Davis	Excalibur writer 1993	Succeeded by Richard Ashford
Preceded by Peter David	X-Factor (vol. 1) writer 1993	Succeeded by J.M. DeMatteis
Preceded by None	Generation X writer 1994–1997	Succeeded by James Robinson
Preceded by Terry Kavanagh	Iron Man writer 1996–1997 (with Jim Lee)	Succeeded by Jeph Loeb
Preceded by Fabian Nicieza	X-Men (vol. 2) writer 1995–1996	Succeeded by Mark Waid
Preceded by Mark Waid	X-Men (vol. 2) writer 1996–1997	Succeeded by Joe Kelly
Preceded by Joe Kelly	Daredevil writer 1998	Succeeded by D.G. Chichester
Preceded by Brandon Choi & Jim Lee	Fantastic Four writer 1998	Succeeded by Chris Claremont
Preceded by Chris Claremont	Uncanny X-Men writer 2001	Succeeded by Joe Casey
Preceded by Chris Claremont	X-Men (vol. 2) writer 2001	Succeeded by Grant Morrison
Preceded by J.T. Krul	Teen Titans writer 2011–2014	Succeeded by Will Pfeifer
