= Galaxy Quest (comics) =

Galaxy Quest is a comic book sequel to the film Galaxy Quest published by IDW Publishing. The series is entitled Global Warning.

Starting in August 2008, the series is written by Scott Lobdell, with art by Ilias Kyriazis, the story centers on the eve of the re-launch of the Galaxy Quest series, now titled Galaxy Quest: The Journey Continues (as featured at the end of the movie), when a world-threatening crisis occurs that requires Jason Nesmith and his fellow actors to save the world once again.

There is also a second series titled "the Journey Continues" which came out January 28, 2015.

== Global Warning ==
=== Issue #1 ===
- Chapter One: Destiny be Mine sees Commander Taggart attempting to defuse an alien bomb to save the Protector from destruction.
- Chapter Two: And the Winner is... reveals that the events in Chapter One are part of the two-hour pilot of Galaxy Quest: The Journey Continues. The cast celebrate after a viewing by going to a party, but they learn that their show is scheduled to be broadcast against a potentially highly rated show.
- Chapter Three: U.F. Friends or Foes? begins with a giant spaceship dropping into orbit causing a number of natural disasters all over the world, which Laliari identifies as a Judgement Ship that always leaves planets in ruins.

=== Issue #2 ===
- Chapter Four: When Titans Clash
- Chapter Five: Reunited
- Chapter Six: Tic...Tic...Tic...Tic...

=== Issue #3 ===
- Chapter Seven: My Homeworld Away from Home...
- Chapter Eight: The Mists of Delos 57
- Chapter Nine: The Last Leg!

=== Issue #4 ===
- Chapter Ten: Be Careful What You Wish For...
- Chapter Eleven: Will Act For Food
- Chapter Twelve: Alas, Poor Jason!

=== Issue #5 ===
- Chapter Thirteen: Inherit a Cosmic wind...
- Chapter Fourteen: My Friend, My Self
- Epilogue: Once Moore With Feeling

== The Journey Continues ==
=== Issue 1 ===
- Once upon a time, a troupe of has-been actors that starred on an old sci-fi show were enlisted by an alien race to save them from an intergalactic tyrant. Despite being way out of their depth, the cast somehow managed to save the aliens and stay alive... but their actions in outer space may have had dire consequences for another world.

=== Issue 2 ===
- The cast of the GALAXY QUEST have enjoyed a career resurgence since returning from their intergalactic adventure, but all that is about to be interrupted by Qint, an alien with a very surprising ax to grind against Jason Nesmith and the crew of the NSEA Protector!

=== Issue 3 ===
- The cast of Galaxy Quest have landed on the planet Dryth, charged by an alien rebel with fixing a mistake they didn't even know they made by meddling in the politics of another planet... but first they have to get through an alien wasteland in one piece. Meanwhile, back on Earth, Guy is stuck at a comic convention with a group of aliens masquerading as his costars. Nothing could go wrong there, right?

=== Issue 4 ===
- The fate of a world hangs in the balance in this explosive finale!
