= Goblin Valley State Park =

State park in Utah, United States

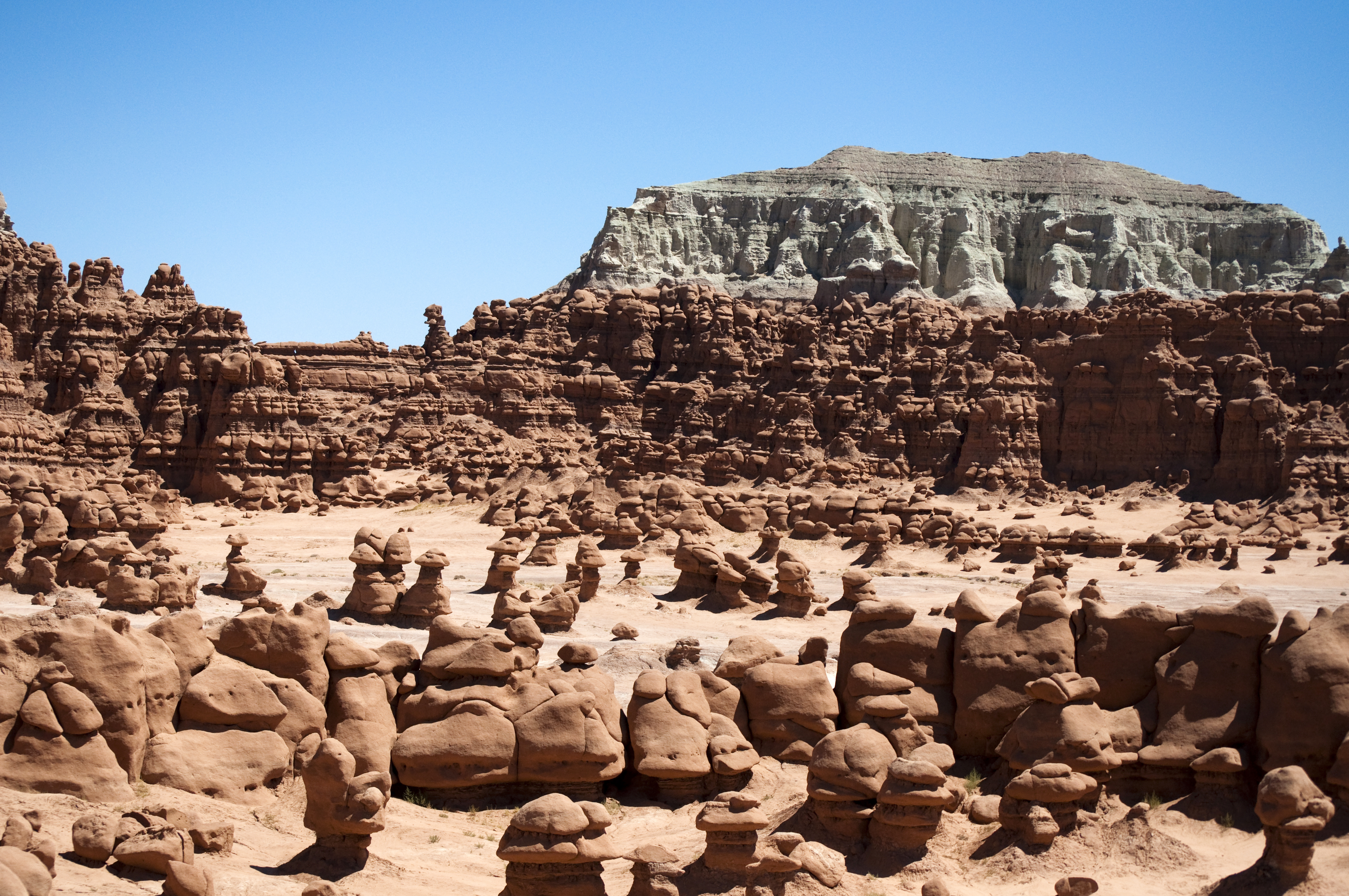
- Hoodoos in Goblin Valley

- Location within Utah Location within the United States
- Interactive map of Goblin Valley State Park
- Location: Emery County, Utah, United States
- Nearest town: Hanksville, Utah
- Coordinates: 38°34′00″N 110°42′36″W
- Area: 9,915 acres (4,012 ha)
- Elevation: 5,000 ft (1,500 m)
- Opened: 1964
- Operator: Utah State Parks
- Visitors: 459,770 (in 2025)
- Website: Official website
- Utah State Parks

Goblin Valley State Park is a state park in Emery County, Utah in the United States. The park is known for its thousands of hoodoos, referred to locally as goblins. The distinct shapes of these rocks result from an erosion-resistant layer of rock atop relatively softer sandstone. Goblin Valley State Park and nearby Bryce Canyon National Park contain some of the largest occurrences of hoodoos in the world.

The park lies within the San Rafael Desert on the southeastern edge of the San Rafael Swell, north of the Henry Mountains. Utah State Route 24 passes about four miles (6.4 km) east of the park, and the town of Hanksville lies 12 miles (19 km) to the south.

== History ==
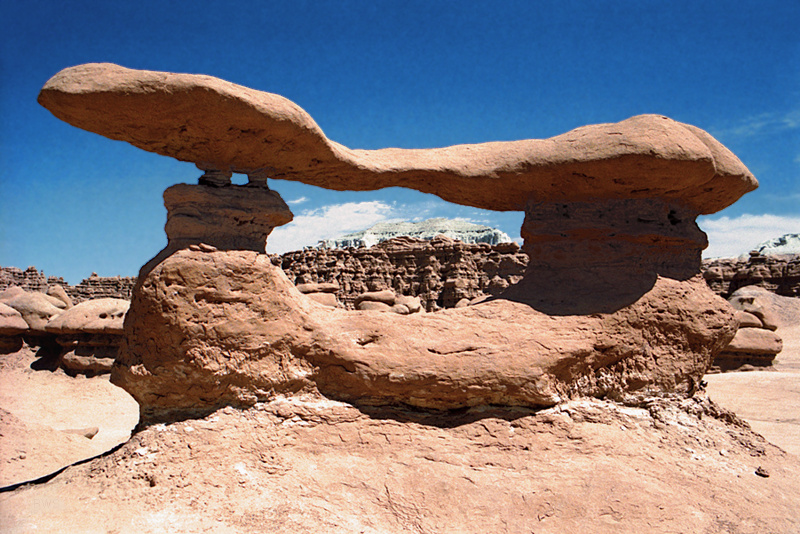
Coffee table arch (collapsed in early 2000s)

Evidence of Native American settlement and culture, including from the Fremont, Paiute, and Ute, can be seen throughout the San Rafael Swell in the form of pictograph and petroglyph panels. The secluded Goblin Valley was discovered by cowboys searching for cattle, and later by Arthur Chaffin, owner/operator of the Hite Ferry, and two companions, searching for an alternate route between Green River and Caineville during the late 1920s. They came to a vantage point about 1 mile (1.6 km) west of the valley and were awed by what they saw – five buttes and a valley of strange, goblin-shaped rock formations surrounded by a wall of eroded cliffs. In 1949, Chaffin returned to the area he called the Valley of the Mushrooms and spent several days exploring and photographing its intricately eroded rocks.

Publicity attracted visitors to the valley despite its remoteness, and in 1954, it was proposed that Goblin Valley be protected. The state of Utah later acquired the property and established Goblin Valley State Reserve, and the region was officially designated a state park on August 24, 1964. In 2019, the state park was expanded by adding 6,261 acres of federal land.

=== 2013 vandalism ===
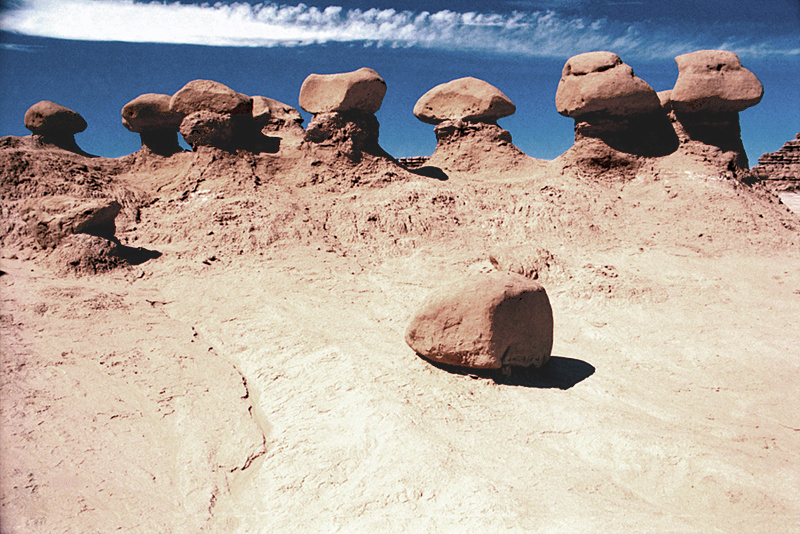
A naturally fallen hoodoo, not the vandalized one

In October 2013, a delicately balanced hoodoo was deliberately knocked over by a Boy Scout leader while two other men watched, one of whom recorded a video that was later uploaded to the Internet. The men claimed that the hoodoo appeared ready to fall, and that it was intentionally knocked over to prevent park visitors from being hurt. The hoodoo formation had existed for millions of years, having formed out of rock that dated back as far as 165 million years.

The two leaders, Glenn Taylor and David Hall, were subsequently dismissed from their leadership roles by the Utah National Parks Council and later removed from their positions altogether by the Boy Scouts of America. In January 2014, two of the men—the one who toppled the hoodoo and the cameraman—were arraigned on felony charges of "criminal mischief" and "intentionally damaging, defacing and destroying property". The two men pleaded guilty to lesser charges of criminal mischief and attempted criminal mischief, and received a sentence of one year probation plus fines and other case-related fees.

== Flora and fauna ==
The flora of Goblin Valley include Mormon tea, Russian thistle, Indian ricegrass, and various cacti, as well as junipers and pinyon pines at higher elevations. Fauna include jackrabbits, scorpions, kangaroo rats, pronghorns, kit foxes, midget faded rattlesnakes, and coyotes.

== Geology ==
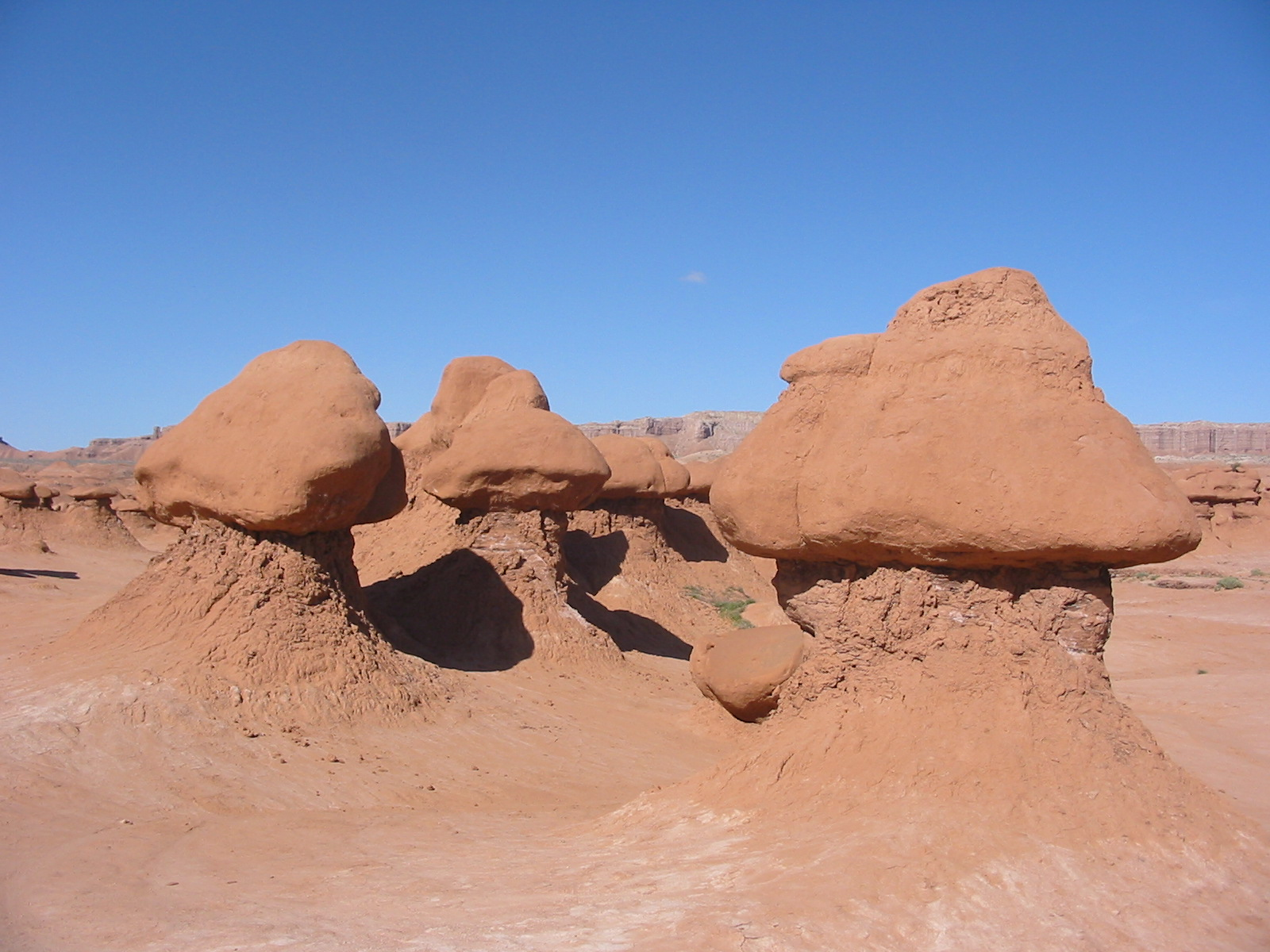
Mushroom caprocks

The unique stone formations in Goblin Valley result from the weathering of Entrada sandstone. The Entrada consists of debris eroded from former highlands and redeposited on a former tidal flat of alternating layers of sandstone, siltstone, and shale. The rocks show evidence of being near the margins of an ancient sea with the ebb and flow of tides, tidal channels that directed currents back to the sea and coastal sand dunes.

Joint or fracture patterns within the Entrada sandstone beds created initial zones of weakness. The unweathered joints then intersected to form sharp edges and corners with greater surface-area-to-volume ratios than the faces. As a result, the edges and corners weathered more quickly, producing the spherical-shaped 'goblins'. The Entrada sandstone from which the hoodoos developed was deposited in the Jurassic period around 170 million years ago.

Goblin Valley State Park is home to Wild Horse Butte, a 5,760-foot (1,756-meter) elevation summit composed of four exposed formations of Jurassic rock.

== Climate ==
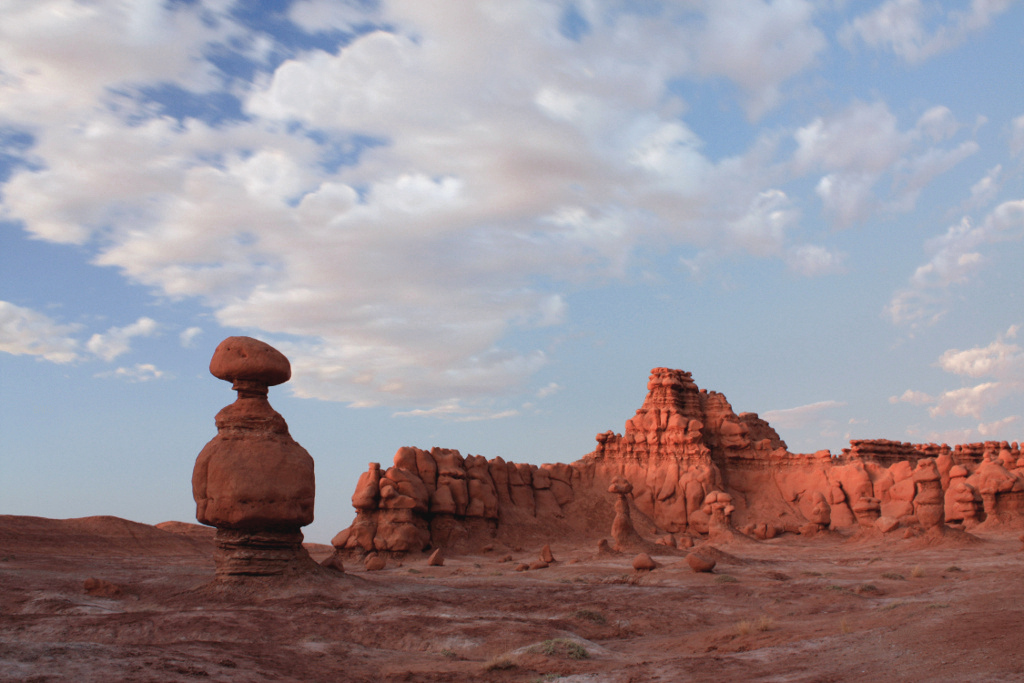
Dark red hoodoos at dusk

Average daytime highs in the summer average between 90 and 105 °F (32 and 41 °C), though the low humidity, high elevation, and sparse vegetation allow evenings to cool off rapidly to about 50 °F (10 °C). The area is also prone to intense summer thunderstorms, flash floods, and wildfires from summer monsoons arriving from the south. Winters have colder temperatures and occasional snow, with temperatures above freezing most days, but often dropping as low as 10 °F (−12 °C) at night. The average precipitation is less than 8 inches (20 cm).

== In popular media ==
Goblin Valley was prominently featured in the movie Galaxy Quest (1999) as an alien planet. The eroded sandstone dunes in the valley inspired the design of the fictional planet’s rock monsters. Portions of other films, including John Carter and City Slickers II, have also been filmed near or inside the park.
